This is an incomplete list of Acts of the Parliament of Great Britain for the years 1780–1789. For Acts passed up until 1707 see List of Acts of the Parliament of England and List of Acts of the Parliament of Scotland. See also the List of Acts of the Parliament of Ireland to 1700 and the List of Acts of the Parliament of Ireland, 1701–1800.

For Acts passed from 1801 onwards see List of Acts of the Parliament of the United Kingdom. For Acts of the devolved parliaments and assemblies in the United Kingdom, see the List of Acts of the Scottish Parliament, the List of Acts of the Northern Ireland Assembly, and the List of Acts and Measures of the National Assembly for Wales; see also the List of Acts of the Parliament of Northern Ireland.

The number shown after each Act's title is its chapter number. Acts are cited using this number, preceded by the year(s) of the reign during which the relevant parliamentary session was held; thus the Union with Ireland Act 1800 is cited as "39 & 40 Geo 3 c 67", meaning the 67th Act passed during the session that started in the 39th year of the reign of George III and which finished in the 40th year of that reign. Note that the modern convention is to use Arabic numerals in citations (thus "41 Geo 3" rather than "41 Geo III"). Acts of the last session of the Parliament of Great Britain and the first session of the Parliament of the United Kingdom are both cited as "41 Geo 3".

Acts passed by the Parliament of Great Britain did not have a short title; however, some of these Acts have subsequently been given a short title by Acts of the Parliament of the United Kingdom (such as the Short Titles Act 1896).

Before the Acts of Parliament (Commencement) Act 1793 came into force on 8 April 1793, Acts passed by the Parliament of Great Britain were deemed to have come into effect on the first day of the session in which they were passed. Because of this, the years given in the list below may in fact be the year before a particular Act was passed.

From the session 38 Geo 3 onwards, "Public Acts" were separated into "Public General Acts" and "Public Local and Personal Acts".

1780 (20 Geo. 3)

| {{|Land Tax Act 1780|public|2|25-11-1779|note3=|repealed=y|archived=n|An Act for granting to his Majesty by a land tax, to be raised in Great Britain, for the service of the year one thousand seven hundred and eighty.}}

| {{|Malt Duties Act 1780|public|3|25-11-1779|note3=|repealed=y|archived=n|An Act for continuing and granting to his Majesty certain duties upon malt, mum, cyder, and perry, for the service of the year one thousand seven hundred and eighty.}}

| {{|Continuance of Acts Act 1780|public|4|25-11-1779|note3=|repealed=y|archived=n|An Act for continuing an act, made in the last session of parliament, for allowing the importation of fine organzined Italian thrown silk in any ships or vessels, for a limited time.}}

| {{|Continuance of Acts Act 1780|public|5|25-11-1779|note3=|repealed=y|archived=n|An Act for further continuing an act, made in the seventeenth year of the reign of his present Majesty, intituled, An Act to impower his Majesty to secure and detain persons charged with, or suspected of, the crime of high treason, committed in any of his Majesty's colonies or plantations in America, or on the high seas, or the crime of piracy.}}

| {{|Trade Act 1780|public|6|25-11-1779|note3=|repealed=y|archived=n|An Act to repeal certain acts made in Great Britain, which restrain the trade and commerce of Ireland with foreign parts.}}

| {{|Customs Act 1780|public|7|25-11-1779|note3=|repealed=y|archived=n|An Act to amend an act, made in the eighteenth year of the reign of present Majesty, intituled, An act to explain and amend so much of an act, made in the fourth year of the reign of his present Majesty, as relates to the preventing the clandestine conveyance of sugar and Paneles from the British colonies and plantations in America into Great Britain.}}

| {{|Militia Act 1780|public|8|25-11-1779|note3=|repealed=y|archived=n|An Act to indemnify such officers of the militia as have not transmitted to the clerks of the peace descriptions of their qualifications, and certificates of their having taken the oaths as required; and for allowing further time for the delivery of descriptions of qualifications by such officers of the militia; and for obliging the captain lieutenant to deliver in a description of his qualification.}}

| {{|Prize Act 1780|public|9|25-11-1779|note3=|repealed=y|archived=n|}}

| {{|Trade Act 1780|public|10|25-11-1779|note3=|repealed=y|archived=n|}}

| {{|Kelso Beer Duties Act 1780|public|11|25-11-1779|note3=|repealed=y|archived=n|}}

| {{|Mutiny Act 1780|public|12|25-11-1779|note3=|repealed=y|archived=n|An Act for punishing mutiny and desertion; and for the better payment of the army and their quarters.}}

| {{|Marine Mutiny Act 1780|public|13|25-11-1779|note3=|repealed=y|archived=n|An Act for the regulation of his Majesty's marine forces while on shore.}}

| {{|Militia Pay Act 1780|public|14|25-11-1779|note3=|repealed=y|archived=n|An Act for defraying the charge of the pay and cloathing of the Militia in that part of Great Britain called England, for one year, beginning the twenty-fifth day of March, one thousand seven hundred and eighty.}}

| {{|Saint Mary-le-Bone Church Act 1780|public|15|25-11-1779|note3=|repealed=y|archived=n|An Act for repealing so much of an act, made in the twelfth year of his present Majesty, intituled, An act for amending and rendering more effectual an act, made in the tenth year of his Majesty's reign, intituled, "An act for building a new parish church, and declaring the present parish church a chapel; for making a cœmetary, or churchyard; and for building an house for the use of the minister of the parish of Saint Mary-le-bone, in the county of Middlesex; as impowers the vestrymen of the said parish to build a church upon a certain parcel of ground, in the said parish, belonging to Henry William Portman, Esquire, heretofore parcel of a certain close, called The Fifteen Acres."}}

| {{|National Debt Act 1780|public|16|25-11-1779|note3=|repealed=y|archived=n|An Act for raising a certain sum of money by way of annuities, and for establishing a lottery.}}

| {{|Parliamentary Elections Act 1780|note1=|public|17|25-11-1779|note3=|repealed=y|archived=n|An Act to remove certain difficulties relative to voters at county elections.}}

| {{|Trade with Ireland Act 1780|public|18|25-11-1779|note3=|repealed=y|archived=n|}}

| {{|Continuance of Laws Act 1780|public|19|25-11-1779|note3=|repealed=y|archived=n|}}

| {{|Supply of Seamen Act 1780|public|20|25-11-1779|note3=|repealed=y|archived=n|An Act for the better supply of mariners and seamen to serve in his Majesty's ships of war, and on board merchant ships, and other trading ships and vessels.}}

| {{|Worcester: Streets Act 1780|public|21|25-11-1779|note3=|repealed=y|archived=n|}}

| {{|Maidstone: Poor Relief Act 1780|public|22|25-11-1779|note3=|repealed=y|archived=n|An Act for the better government and regulation of the poor, in the town and parish of Maidstone, in the county of Kent.}}

| {{|Navy Act 1780|public|23|25-11-1779|note3=|repealed=y|archived=n|An act to amend an act made in the last session of parliament, intituled, An act for the encouragement of seamen, and the more speedy and effectual manning his Majesty's navy; and for making further provisions for those purposes.}}

| {{|Kirkcudbright Roads Act 1780|public|24|25-11-1779|note3=|repealed=y|archived=n|An Act for converting in money the statute labour, the stewartry of Kirkcudbright, for the purpose of repairing the highways, bridges, and ferries, within the said stewartry.}}

| {{|Customs Act 1780|public|25|25-11-1779|note3=|repealed=y|archived=n|An Act for repealing the duties payable upon pot and pearl ashes, wood and weed ashes, imported into Great Britain, and for granting other duties in lieu thereof, for a limited time.}}

| {{|Aberystwyth Harbour Act 1780|public|26|25-11-1779|note3=|repealed=y|archived=n|An Act for repairing, enlarging, and preserving the harbour of Aberystwyth, in the county of Cardingan.}}

| {{|Whitney Bridge, Wye Act 1780|public|27|25-11-1779|note3=|repealed=y|archived=n|An Act for building a bridge across the river Wye, between Whitney and Clifford, in the county of Hereford.}}

| {{|Stamp Duties Act 1780|public|28|25-11-1779|note3=|repealed=y|archived=n|}}

| {{|Trade Act 1780|public|29|25-11-1779|note3=|repealed=y|archived=n|An Act to protect goods or merchandize, of the growth, produce, or manufacture, of the islands of Grenada and the Granadines, on board neutral vessels bound to neutral ports, during the present hostilities.}}

| {{|Customs Act 1780|public|30|25-11-1779|note3=|repealed=y|archived=n|An Act for granting to his Majesty several additional duties upon wines and vinegar imported into this kingdom.}}

| {{|Bounty on Corn Act 1780|public|31|25-11-1779|note3=|repealed=y|archived=n|}}

| {{|Walton-Shepperton Bridge (Rebuilding and Tolls) Act 1780|public|32|25-11-1779|note3=|repealed=y|archived=n|}}

| {{|Rolls Estate Act 1780|public|33|25-11-1779|note3=|repealed=y|archived=n|An Act to explain and amend an act, made in the seventeenth year of the reign of his present Majesty, intituled, An act to repeal an act, made in the twelfth year of the reign of King Charles the Second, intituled, "The master of the rolls impowered to make leases for years, in order to new-build the old houses belonging to the rolls;" and for the better regulating the method of granting leases for the said rolls estate for the future; and for making compensation to the Earl of Macclesfield, and Sir Thomas Sewell, for their beneficial rights and interests in certain leases made of the rolls estate; and for regulating the method of making leases of the said estate for the future.}}

| {{|Salt Duties Act 1780|public|34|25-11-1779|note3=|repealed=y|archived=n|An Act for granting to his Majesty additional duties upon salt; and for regulating the exportation of salt to the Isle of Man.}}

| {{|Duties on Malt, etc. Act 1780|public|35|25-11-1779|note3=|repealed=y|archived=n|}}

| {{|Poor Apprentices Act 1780|public|36|25-11-1779|note3=|repealed=y|archived=n|}}

| {{|Volunteers Act 1780|public|37|25-11-1779|note3=|repealed=y|archived=n|}}

| {{|Plymouth, Sheerness, Gravesend, Tilbury – Fortifications Act 1780|public|38|25-11-1779|note3=|repealed=y|archived=n|}}

| {{|Tobacco Act 1780|public|39|25-11-1779|note3=|repealed=y|archived=n|}}

| {{|Completion of Somerset House Act 1780|public|40|25-11-1779|note3=|repealed=y|archived=n|An act to repeal so much of an act, made in the fifteenth year of his Majesty's reign (for settling Buckingham House upon the Queen, in lieu of Somerset House; and for other purposes), as enables the commissioners of his Majesty's treasury to apply the sums necessary for completing Somerset House, out of the aids granted for naval services, or out of any of the revenues arising from the receipt of the several offices to be erected and established by virtue of the said act.}}

| {{|Payment of Creditors (Scotland) Act 1780|public|41|25-11-1779|note3=|repealed=y|archived=n|}}

| {{|Isle of Man Act 1780|public|42|25-11-1779|note3=|repealed=y|archived=n|An Act for granting his Majesty several additional duties upon certain goods imported into the Isle of Man; and for better regulating the trade and securing the revenues of the said island.}}

| {{|Loans or Exchequer Bills Act 1780|public|43|25-11-1779|note3=|repealed=y|archived=n|An Act for raising a certain some of money by loans or exchequer bills, for the service of the year one thousand seven hundred and eighty.}}

| {{|Militia Act 1780|public|44|25-11-1779|note3=|repealed=y|archived=n|}}

| {{|Importation, etc. Act 1780|public|45|25-11-1779|note3=|repealed=y|archived=n|}}

| {{|Exportation Act 1780|public|46|25-11-1779|note3=|repealed=y|archived=n|An Act to allow the exportation of provisions, goods, wares, and merchandize, from Great Britain, to certain towns, ports or places, in North America, which are or may be under the protection of his Majesty's arms; and from such towns, ports or places, to Great Britain, and other parts of his Majesty's dominions.}}

| {{|Indemnity Act 1780|public|47|25-11-1779|note3=|repealed=y|archived=n|}}

| {{|Goswell Street, Middlesex Act 1780|public|48|25-11-1779|note3=|repealed=y|archived=n|An Act for repairing, lighting, watching, and cleaning, the high street or road, called Goswell-street, leading from Aldersgate-bars, without Aldersgate, London, to the house of Woodhouse Coker Gentleman, near the turnpike at the end of the said street or road, in the county of Middlesex; and also Bull-yard, Glasshouse-yard, the north side of Fan's-alley, Mount mill, and Willow-court, contiguous to the said street or road, on the east and west sides thereof; and for removing nuisances therefrom, and preventing the like for the future.}}

| {{|Chatham – Fortifications Act 1780|public|49|25-11-1779|note3=|repealed=y|archived=n|An Act to vest certain messuages, lands, tenements, and hereditaments, in trustees, for the better securing his Majesty's dock, ships, and stores, at Chatham.}}

| {{|Parliament Act 1780|public|50|25-11-1779|note3=|repealed=y|archived=n|}}

| {{|Taxation Act 1780|public|51|25-11-1779|note3=|repealed=y|archived=n|}}

| {{|Taxation Act 1780|public|52|25-11-1779|note3=|repealed=y|archived=n|An Act for granting to his Majesty additional duties upon starch and hair powder imported, and upon starch made in Great Britain, and upon sweets.}}

| {{|Loans or Exchequer Bills Act 1780|public|53|25-11-1779|note3=|repealed=y|archived=n|An Act for raising a further sum of money, by loans or exchequer bills, for the service of the year one thousand seven hundred and eighty.}}

| {{|Audit of Public Accounts Act 1780|public|54|25-11-1779|note3=|repealed=y|archived=n|}}

| {{|Wool Act 1780|public|55|25-11-1779|note3=|repealed=y|archived=n|}}

| {{|East India Company Act 1780|public|56|25-11-1779|note3=|repealed=y|archived=n|An Act for continuing in the possession of the united company of merchants of England trading to the East Indies, for a further time, and under certain conditions, the territorial acquisitions and revenues lately obtained in the East Indies; and for reviving, and continuing for a further time, so much of an act, made in the thirteenth year of the reign of his present Majesty, (intituled, An act for establishing certain regulations for the better management of the affairs of the East India company, as well in India as in Europe,) as hath expired in the course of the present year; and for indemnifying the said company for any money they have paid, or may pay, in or about the building of three ships of the line for the service of the publick.}}

| {{|Loans or Exchequer Bills Act 1780|public|57|25-11-1779|note3=|repealed=y|archived=n|An Act for enabling his Majesty to raise the sum of one million, for the uses and purposes therein mentioned.}}

| {{|East India Company Act 1780|public|58|25-11-1779|note3=|repealed=y|archived=n|An Act for granting further time for allowing the drawback on the exportation of coffee imported by the East India company, in the ship Europa, in the year one thousand seven hundred and seventy-five.}}

| {{|Exportations, etc. Act 1780|public|59|25-11-1779|note3=|repealed=y|archived=n|An Act to empower his Majesty to prohibit the exportation, and to restrain the carrying coastwise, of copper in bars, or copper in sheets, for a limited time.}}

| {{|Fisheries Act 1780|public|60|25-11-1779|note3=|repealed=y|archived=n|An Act to explain and amend two acts made in the fifteenth and sixteenth years of the reign of his present Majesty, with respect to the limits of the Greenland seas and Davis's streights, and the seas adjacent thereto; and to enlarge the time for the return of the vessels employed in the whale fisheries.}}

| {{|Finding of the Longitude at Sea Act 1780|public|61|25-11-1779|note3=|repealed=y|archived=n|An Act for continuing the encouragement and reward of persons making certain discoveries for finding longitude at sea, or making other useful discoveries and improvements in navigation, and for making experiments relating thereto.}}

| {{|Appropriation Act 1780|public|62|25-11-1779|note3=|repealed=y|archived=n|An Act for granting to his Majesty a certain sum of money out of the sinking fund; and for applying certain monies therein mentioned for the service of the year one thousand seven hundred and eighty; and for further appropriating the supplies granted in this session of parliament.}}

| {{|Indemnity, Suppression of Riots Act 1780|public|63|25-11-1779|note3=|repealed=y|archived=n|An Act to indemnify such persons as have acted in the suppression of the late riots and tumults, in and about the cities of London and Westminster, and borough of Southwark, and for the preservation of the public peace.}}

| {{|Release of Prisoners by Rioters Act 1780|public|64|25-11-1779|note3=|repealed=y|archived=n|}}

| {{|West Riding: Small Debts Act 1780|public|65|25-11-1779|note3=|repealed=y|archived=n|}}

| {{|Stepney: Poor Relief, etc. Act 1780|public|66|25-11-1779|note3=|repealed=y|archived=n|}}

| {{|Banbury Road Act 1780|public|67|25-11-1779|note3=|repealed=y|archived=n|}}

| {{|Bedford and Buckingham Roads Act 1780|public|68|25-11-1779|note3=|repealed=y|archived=n|}}

| {{|Warwick and Oxford Roads Act 1780|public|69|25-11-1779|note3=|repealed=y|archived=n|}}

| {{|Gloucester Roads Act 1780|public|70|25-11-1779|note3=|repealed=y|archived=n|}}

| {{|Warwick and Worcester Roads Act 1780|public|71|25-11-1779|note3=|repealed=y|archived=n|}}

| {{|Mansfield to Chesterfield Road Act 1780|public|72|25-11-1779|note3=|repealed=y|archived=n|}}

| {{|Lincoln and Nottinghamshire Roads Act 1780|public|73|25-11-1779|note3=|repealed=y|archived=n|}}

| {{|Derby and Nottinghamshire Roads Act 1780|public|74|25-11-1779|note3=|repealed=y|archived=n|}}

| {{|Lincoln Roads Act 1780|public|75|25-11-1779|note3=|repealed=y|archived=n|}}

| {{|Burford to Preston Road Act 1780|public|76|25-11-1779|note3=|repealed=y|archived=n|}}

| {{|Southampton Roads Act 1780|public|77|25-11-1779|note3=|repealed=y|archived=n|}}

| {{|Highgate and Hampstead Roads Act 1780|public|78|25-11-1779|note3=|repealed=y|archived=n|}}

| {{|Devon Roads Act 1780|public|79|25-11-1779|note3=|repealed=y|archived=n|}}

| {{|Warwick Roads Act 1780|public|80|25-11-1779|note3=|repealed=y|archived=n|}}

| {{|Nottinghamshire Leicester Rutland and Northampton Roads Act 1780|public|81|25-11-1779|note3=|repealed=y|archived=n|}}

| {{|Wiltshire Roads Act 1780|public|82|25-11-1779|note3=|repealed=y|archived=n|}}

| {{|Sussex Roads Act 1780|public|83|25-11-1779|note3=|repealed=y|archived=n|}}

| {{|Gloucester Roads Act 1780|public|84|25-11-1779|note3=|repealed=y|archived=n|}}

| {{|Somerset Roads Act 1780|public|85|25-11-1779|note3=|repealed=y|archived=n|}}

| {{|Trent Bridge to Cotes Bridge Road Act 1780|public|87|25-11-1779|note3=|repealed=y|archived=n|}}

| {{|Westmorland Roads Act 1780|public|88|25-11-1779|note3=|repealed=y|archived=n|}}

| {{|Yorkshire Roads Act 1780|public|89|25-11-1779|note3=|repealed=y|archived=n|}}

| {{|Southampton Roads Act 1780|public|90|25-11-1779|note3=|repealed=y|archived=n|}}

| {{|Macclesfield to Buxton Road Act 1780|public|91|25-11-1779|note3=|repealed=y|archived=n|}}

| {{|Hamptonshire and Dorset Roads Act 1780|public|92|25-11-1779|note3=|repealed=y|archived=n|}}

| {{|Gloucester Roads Act 1780|public|93|25-11-1779|note3=|repealed=y|archived=n|}}

| {{|Louth Roads Act 1780|public|94|25-11-1779|note3=|repealed=y|archived=n|An Act for enlarging the term and powers of an act made in the tenth year of the reign of his present Majesty, intituled, An act for repairing and widening several roads leading from the town of Louth, in the county of Lincoln.}}

| {{|Melton Mowbray to Grantham Road Act 1780|public|95|25-11-1779|note3=|repealed=y|archived=n|An Act for making and maintaining a red from Sage Cross, in the town of Melton Mowbray, in the county of Leicester, to the town of Grantham, in the county of Lincoln.}}

| {{|Guildford to Farnham Road Act 1780|public|96|25-11-1779|note3=|repealed=y|archived=n|}}

| {{|Denbigh Flint and Carnarvon Roads Act 1780|public|97|25-11-1779|note3=|repealed=y|archived=n|}}

| {{|Wiltshire Roads Act 1780|public|98|25-11-1779|note3=|repealed=y|archived=n|}}

| {{|Sunning to Egham Road Act 1780|public|99|25-11-1779|note3=|repealed=y|archived=n|}}

| {{|Surrey Roads Act 1780|public|100|25-11-1779|note3=|repealed=y|archived=n|An Act for enlarging the term and powers of an act, made in the twenty-eighth year of the reign of his late majesty King George the Second, intituled, An act for amending, widening, and keeping in repair, the roads from Epsom, through Ewell, to Tooting, and from Ewell to Kingston upon Thames, and Thames Ditton, in the county of Surrey; and for amending, widening, and keeping in repair, the road from the turnpike road at Ewell, across Ewell common fields, to the Ryegate turnpike road, on Borough Heath, in the said county.}}

}}

1781 (21 Geo. 3)

| {{|Habeas Corpus Suspension Act 1781|public|2|31-10-1780|note3=|repealed=y|archived=n|}}

| {{|Land Tax Act 1781|public|3|31-10-1780|note3=|repealed=y|archived=n|}}

| {{|Malt Duties Act 1781|public|4|31-10-1780|note3=|repealed=y|archived=n|}}

| {{|Prize Act 1781|public|5|31-10-1780|note3=|repealed=y|archived=n|}}

| {{|Importation Act 1781|public|6|31-10-1780|note3=|repealed=y|archived=n|}}

| {{|Militia Act 1781|public|7|31-10-1780|note3=|repealed=y|archived=n|}}

| {{|Mutiny Act 1781|public|8|31-10-1780|note3=|repealed=y|archived=n|}}

| {{|Marine Mutiny Act 1781|public|9|31-10-1780|note3=|repealed=y|archived=n|}}

| {{|Kent, Sussex Fortifications Act 1781|public|10|31-10-1780|note3=|repealed=y|archived=n|}}

| {{|Navy, etc. Act 1781|public|11|31-10-1780|note3=|repealed=y|archived=n|}}

| {{|Whitby Harbour Act 1781|public|12|31-10-1780|note3=|repealed=y|archived=n|}}

| {{|Stow, Suffolk: Poor Relief Act 1781|public|13|31-10-1780|note3=|repealed=y|archived=n|}}

| {{|Lotteries (Ireland) Act 1780|note1=|public|14|31-10-1780|note3=|repealed=y|archived=n|}}

| {{|Navy Act 1781|public|15|31-10-1780|note3=|repealed=y|archived=n|}}

| {{|Customs Act 1781|public|16|31-10-1780|note3=|repealed=y|archived=n|}}

| {{|Excise Duties Act 1781|public|17|31-10-1780|note3=|repealed=y|archived=n|}}

| {{|Militia Act 1781|public|18|31-10-1780|note3=|repealed=y|archived=n|}}

| {{|Navigation Act 1781|public|19|31-10-1780|note3=|repealed=y|archived=n|}}

| {{|Turnpike Roads Act 1781|public|20|31-10-1780|note3=|repealed=y|archived=n|}}

| {{|Militia Pay Act 1781|public|21|31-10-1780|note3=|repealed=y|archived=n|}}

| {{|Bourn, Lincolnshire: Navigation Act 1781|public|22|31-10-1780|note3=|repealed=y|archived=n|}}

| {{|Land Tax Act 1781|public|23|31-10-1780|note3=|repealed=y|archived=n|}}

| {{|Paper Duties Act 1781|public|24|31-10-1780|note3=|repealed=y|archived=n|}}

| {{|Indemnity Act 1781|public|25|31-10-1780|note3=|repealed=y|archived=n|}}

| {{|Importation Act 1781|public|26|31-10-1780|note3=|repealed=y|archived=n|}}

| {{|Importation Act 1781|public|27|31-10-1780|note3=|repealed=y|archived=n|}}

| {{|Customs Act 1781|public|28|31-10-1780|note3=|repealed=y|archived=n|}}

| {{|Continuance of Laws Act 1781|public|29|31-10-1780|note3=|repealed=y|archived=n|}}

| {{|River Colne: Navigation Act 1781|public|30|31-10-1780|note3=|repealed=y|archived=n|}}

| {{|Duties on Servants Act 1781|public|31|31-10-1780|note3=|repealed=y|archived=n|}}

| {{|Customs Act 1781|public|32|31-10-1780|note3=|repealed=y|archived=n|}}

| {{|Henley-upon-Thames Bridge Act 1781|public|33|31-10-1780|note3=|repealed=y|archived=n|}}

| {{|Admeasurement of Coals Act 1781|public|34|31-10-1780|note3=|repealed=y|archived=n|}}

| {{|Old Shoreham, Bridge, Sussex Act 1781|public|35|31-10-1780|note3=|repealed=y|archived=n|}}

| {{|Devizes: Streets Act 1781|public|36|31-10-1780|note3=|repealed=y|archived=n|}}

| {{|Exportation Act 1781|public|37|31-10-1780|note3=|repealed=y|archived=n|}}

| {{|Small Debts, Beverley Act 1781|public|38|31-10-1780|note3=|repealed=y|archived=n|}}

| {{|Smuggling Act 1781|public|39|31-10-1780|note3=|repealed=y|archived=n|}}

| {{|Bounties Act 1781|public|40|31-10-1780|note3=|repealed=y|archived=n|}}

| {{|Loans or Exchequer Bills Act 1781|public|41|31-10-1780|note3=|repealed=y|archived=n|}}

| {{|Loans or Exchequer Bills Act 1781|public|42|31-10-1780|note3=|repealed=y|archived=n|}}

| {{|Parliament Act 1781|public|43|31-10-1780|note3=|repealed=y|archived=n|}}

| {{|Prize Act 1781|public|44|31-10-1780|note3=|repealed=y|archived=n|}}

| {{|Audit of Public Accounts Act 1781|public|45|31-10-1780|note3=|repealed=y|archived=n|}}

| {{|Woolwich Fortifications Act 1781|public|46|31-10-1780|note3=|repealed=y|archived=n|}}

| {{|Oxford: Improvements Act 1781|public|47|31-10-1780|note3=|repealed=y|archived=n|}}

| {{|Paymaster-general, Balance, etc. Act 1781|public|48|31-10-1780|note3=|repealed=y|archived=n|}}

| {{|Sunday Observance Act 1780|note1= or the Sunday Observance Act 1781|public|49|31-10-1780|note3=|repealed=y|archived=n|An Act for preventing certain Abuses and Profanations on the Lord's Day called Sunday.|note4= }}

| {{|Corn Act 1781|public|50|31-10-1780|note3=|repealed=y|archived=n|}}

| {{|Papists Act 1781|public|51|31-10-1780|note3=|repealed=y|archived=n|}}

| {{|Finding of the Longitude at Sea Act 1781|public|52|31-10-1780|note3=|repealed=y|archived=n|}}

| {{|Confirmation of Certain Marriages Act 1781|public|53|31-10-1780|note3=|repealed=y|archived=n|}}

| {{|Coventry Freemen, etc. Act 1781|public|54|31-10-1780|note3=|repealed=y|archived=n|}}

| {{|Excise Act 1781|public|55|31-10-1780|note3=|repealed=y|archived=n|}}

| {{|Duty on Almanacks Act 1781|public|56|31-10-1780|note3=|repealed=y|archived=n|}}

| {{|Appropriation Act 1781|public|57|31-10-1780|note3=|repealed=y|archived=n|}}

| {{|Growth of Hemp and Flax Act 1781|public|58|31-10-1780|note3=|repealed=y|archived=n|}}

| {{|Loans or Exchequer Bills Act 1781|public|59|31-10-1780|note3=|repealed=y|archived=n|}}

| {{|Advance by Bank of England Act 1781|public|60|31-10-1780|note3=|repealed=y|archived=n|}}

| {{|Criminal Law Act 1781|public|68|31-10-1780|note3=|repealed=y|archived=n|}}

| {{|Criminal Law Act 1781|public|69|31-10-1780|note3=|repealed=y|archived=n|}}

| {{|Plymouth Fortifications Act 1781|public|61|31-10-1780|note3=|repealed=y|archived=n|}}

| {{|Importation Act 1781|public|62|31-10-1780|note3=|repealed=y|archived=n|}}

| {{|Insolvent Debtors Relief Act 1781|public|63|31-10-1780|note3=|repealed=y|archived=n|}}

| {{|Excise Act 1781|public|64|31-10-1780|note3=|repealed=y|archived=n|}}

| {{|East India Company Act 1781|public|65|31-10-1780|note3=|repealed=y|archived=n|}}

| {{|Clergy Residences Repair Act 1780|note1=Sometimes called the Clergy Residences Repair Act 1781.|public|66|31-10-1780|note3=|repealed=y|archived=n|}}

| {{|Driving of Cattle, Metropolis Act 1781|public|67|31-10-1780|note3=|repealed=y|archived=n|}}

| {{|East India Company Act 1780|note1=Also called the East India Company Act 1781.|public|70|31-10-1780|note3=|repealed=y|archived=n|}}

| {{|Saint Christopher-le-Stocks Church, London Act 1781|public|71|31-10-1780|note3=|repealed=y|archived=n|}}

| {{|Plymouth: Poor Relief, etc. Act 1781|public|72|31-10-1780|note3=|repealed=y|archived=n|}}

| {{|Stepney and Hackney Manor Courts Act 1781|public|73|31-10-1780|note3=|repealed=y|archived=n|}}

| {{|Gloucester Gaol Act 1781|public|74|31-10-1780|note3=|repealed=y|archived=n|}}

| {{|River Stower, Navigation Act 1781|public|75|31-10-1780|note3=|repealed=y|archived=n|}}

| {{|Escrick Church, Yorkshire Act 1781|public|76|31-10-1780|note3=|repealed=y|archived=n|}}

| {{|Oxford and Buckinghamshire Road Act 1781|public|77|31-10-1780|note3=|repealed=y|archived=n|}}

| {{|Cornwall Roads Act 1781|public|78|31-10-1780|note3=|repealed=y|archived=n|}}

| {{|Linlithgow Roads Act 1781|public|79|31-10-1780|note3=|repealed=y|archived=n|}}

| {{|Denbigh to Ruthland Road Act 1781|public|80|31-10-1780|note3=|repealed=y|archived=n|}}

| {{|Derbyshire Roads Act 1781|public|81|31-10-1780|note3=|repealed=y|archived=n|}}

| {{|Cheshire Roads Act 1781|public|82|31-10-1780|note3=|repealed=y|archived=n|}}

| {{|Derbyshire Roads Act 1781|public|83|31-10-1780|note3=|repealed=y|archived=n|}}

| {{|Devon Roads Act 1781|public|84|31-10-1780|note3=|repealed=y|archived=n|}}

| {{|Leicester and Warwick Roads Act 1781|public|85|31-10-1780|note3=|repealed=y|archived=n|}}

| {{|Launceston Roads Act 1781|public|86|31-10-1780|note3=|repealed=y|archived=n|}}

| {{|Oxford Roads Act 1781|public|87|31-10-1780|note3=|repealed=y|archived=n|}}

| {{|Warwick and Worcester Roads Act 1781|public|88|31-10-1780|note3=|repealed=y|archived=n|}}

| {{|Leicester Roads Act 1781|public|89|31-10-1780|note3=|repealed=y|archived=n|}}

| {{|Cornwall Roads Act 1781|public|90|31-10-1780|note3=|repealed=y|archived=n|}}

| {{|Berwick Roads Act 1781|public|91|31-10-1780|note3=|repealed=y|archived=n|}}

| {{|Derby Leicester and Warwick Roads Act 1781|public|92|31-10-1780|note3=|repealed=y|archived=n|}}

| {{|Worcestershire Staffordshire Shropshire Roads Act 1781|public|93|31-10-1780|note3=|repealed=y|archived=n|}}

| {{|Northamptonshire Roads Act 1781|public|94|31-10-1780|note3=|repealed=y|archived=n|}}

| {{|Skipton Roads Act 1781|public|95|31-10-1780|note3=|repealed=y|archived=n|}}

| {{|Yorkshire Roads Act 1781|public|96|31-10-1780|note3=|repealed=y|archived=n|}}

| {{|Henley to Oxford Road Act 1781|public|97|31-10-1780|note3=|repealed=y|archived=n|}}

| {{|Leeds to Otley Road Act 1781|public|98|31-10-1780|note3=|repealed=y|archived=n|}}

| {{|Addingham to Black Lane End Road Act 1781|public|99|31-10-1780|note3=|repealed=y|archived=n|}}

| {{|Kent and Surrey Roads Act 1781|public|100|31-10-1780|note3=|repealed=y|archived=n|}}

| {{|Berkshire and Wiltshire Roads Act 1781|public|101|31-10-1780|note3=|repealed=y|archived=n|}}

| {{|Leeds and Blackburn Roads Act 1781|public|102|31-10-1780|note3=|repealed=y|archived=n|}}

| {{|Kettering to Newport Pagnell Road Act 1781|public|103|31-10-1780|note3=|repealed=y|archived=n|}}

| {{|Somerset Roads Act 1781|public|104|31-10-1780|note3=|repealed=y|archived=n|}}

| {{|Hereford Roads Act 1781|public|105|31-10-1780|note3=|repealed=y|archived=n|}}

| {{|Warwick and Northampton Roads Act 1781|public|106|31-10-1780|note3=|repealed=y|archived=n|}}

}}

1782 (22 Geo. 3)

| {{|Land Tax Act 1782|public|2|20-12-1781|repealed=y|archived=n|An Act for granting an Aid to His Majesty by a Land Tax to be raised in Great Britain, for the Service of the Year One thousand seven hundred and eightytwo.|note4= }}

| {{|Importation Act 1782|public|7|27-11-1781|note3=|repealed=y|archived=n| |note4= }}

| {{|Land Tax (Commissioners) Act 1782|public|9|25-03-1782|repealed=y|archived=n|An Act for rectifying Mistakes in the Names of several of the Commissioners appointed by an Act made in the last Session of Parliament to put in Execution an Act made in the same Session, intituled, An Act for granting an Aid to His Majesty by a Land Tax to be raised in Great Britain, for the Service of the Year One thousand seven hundred and eightyone;" and for appointing other Commissioners, together with those named in the first mentioned Act, to put in Execution an Act of this Session of Parliament, for granting an Aid to His Majesty by a Land Tax to be raised in Great Britain, for the Service of the Year One thousand seven hundred and eighty-two.|note4= }}

| {{|Exchange of American Prisoners Act 1782|public|10|25-03-1782|repealed=y|archived=n|An Act for the better detaining and more easy Exchange of American Prisoners brought into Great Britain.|note4= }}

| {{|Continuance of Laws Act 1782|public|13|25-03-1782|repealed=y|archived=n|An Act to continue several Laws therein mentioned, relating to the better Encouragement of the making of Sail Cloth in Great Britain; to the Encouragement of the Silk Manufactures; and for taking off several Duties on Merchandize exported, and reducing other Duties; to the free Importation of Cochineal and Indigo; to the prohibiting the Importation of Books re-printed Abroad, and first composed, written and printed in Great Britain; to securing the Duties upon Foreign made Sail Cloth, and charging Foreign made Sails with a Duty; to the allowing a Bounty on the Exportation of British Cornand Grain in Neutral Ships; to the allowing the Exportation of Provisions, Goods, Wares and Merchandizes to certain Places in North America, which are or may be under the Protection of His Majesty's Arms, and from such Places to Great Britain and other Parts of His Majesty's Dominions; to the empowering His Majesty to prohibit the Exportation and restrain the carrying Coastwife of Copper in Bars or Copper in Sheets; and to the allowing the Exportation of certain Quantities of Wheat and other Articles to His Majesty's Sugar Colonies in America.|note4= }}

| {{|Cobham, Leatherhead and Godalming Bridges Act 1782|public|17|25-03-1782|repealed=y|archived=n|An Act to repair, enlarge and rebuild Cobham, Leatherhead and Godalming Bridges, in the County of Surrey.}}

| {{|Dalkeith Beer Duties Act 1782|public|18|25-03-1782|repealed=y|archived=n|An Act for continuing the Term and Powers of an Act made in the Thirty-third Year of the Reign of His late Majesty King George the Second, intituled, An Act for laying a Duty of Two Pennies Scots, or One-sixth Part of a Penny Sterling, on every Scots Pint of Ale, Porter or Beer brewed for Sale, or vended within the Town and Parish of Dalkeith.}}

| {{|Greenland, etc., Fishery Act 1782|public|19|03-05-1782|repealed=y|archived=n|An Act for granting an additional Bounty on Ships employed in the Greenland and Whale Fishery, for a limited Time.|note4= }}

| {{|Customs Act 1782|public|20|27-11-1781|note3=|repealed=y|archived=n| |note4=|note4= }}

| {{|Customs (No. 2) Act 1782|public|21|27-11-1781|note3=|repealed=y|archived=n| |note4=|note4= }}

| {{|Customs (No. 3) Act 1782|public|28|27-11-1781|note3=|repealed=y|archived=n| |note4=|note4= }}

| {{|Importation (No. 2) Act 1782|public|30|27-11-1781|note3=|repealed=y|archived=n| |note4=|note4= }}

| {{|Coals, Newcastle Act 1782|public|32|17-05-1782|repealed=y|archived=n|An Act to revive and continue an Act, passed in the Sixth Year of the Reign of His present Majesty, intituled, "An Act to regulate the Loading of Ships with Coals, in the Ports of Newcastle and Sunderland.}}

| {{|Loans or Exchequer Bills Act 1782|public|36|27-11-1781|note3=|repealed=y|archived=n| |note4=|note4= }}

| {{|Importation (No. 3) Act 1782|public|38|27-11-1781|note3=|repealed=y|archived=n| |note4=|note4= }}

| {{|Criminal Law Act 1782|public|40|27-11-1781|note3=|repealed=y|archived=n| |note4=|note4= }}

| {{|Kew Bridge (Building and Tolls) Act 1782|public|42|17-05-1782|repealed=y|archived=n|An Act for building a Stone Bridge cross the River of Thames, from the Parish of Ealing, in the County of Middlesex, to the opposite Shore in the Hamlet of Kew, in the County of Surrey.}}

| {{|House of Commons (Disqualification) Act 1782|note1=|public|45|27-11-1781|note3=|repealed=y|archived=n|}}

| {{|Lottery Office Keepers Act 1782|public|47|19-06-1782|repealed=y|archived=n|An Act for licensing Lottery Office Keepers, and regulating the Sale of Lottery Tickets.|note4=|note4= }}

| {{|Fire Insurance Duty Act 1782|public|48|27-11-1781|note3=|repealed=y|archived=n| |note4=|note4= }}

| {{|Customs (No. 4) Act 1782|public|49|27-11-1781|note3=|repealed=y|archived=n| |note4=|note4= }}

| {{|Audit of Public Accounts Act 1782|public|50|19-06-1782|repealed=y|archived=n|An Act for further continuing an Act made in the Twentieth Year of the Reign of His present Majesty, intituled, "An Act for appointing and enabling Commissioners to examine, take, and state the Public Accounts of the Kingdom, and to report what Balances are in the Hands of Accountants, which may be applied to the Public Service, and what Defects there are in the present Mode of receiving, collecting, issuing, and accounting for Public Money, and in what more expeditious and effectual and less expensive Manner, the said Services can in future be regulated and carried on for the Benefit of the Public.|note4=|note4= }}

| {{|East India Company Act 1782|public|51|19-06-1782|repealed=y|archived=n|An Act to discharge and indemnify the United Company of Merchants of England trading to the East Indies from all Damage, Interests and Losses in respect to their having made Default in certain Payments due to the Public, on such Payments being made at a future stipulated Time; and to enable the said Company to continue a Dividend of Eight Pounds per Centum to the Proprietors of their Stock for the present Year.|note4=|note4= }}

| {{|Edinburgh (Slaughter of Animals) Act 1782|public|52|19-06-1782|repealed=y|archived=n|An Act for preventing the slaughtering of Cattle within the City of Edinburgh, and for removing Nuisances and Annoyances therefrom.}}

| {{|Indemnity Act 1782|public|55|27-11-1781|note3=|repealed=y|archived=n| |note4=|note4= }}

| {{|Lancaster Bridge Act 1782|public|57|19-06-1782|repealed=y|archived=n|An Act for building a new Bridge instead of the present antient Bridge, commonly called Lancaster Bridge, at a more convenient Place over the River Loyne, near the Town of Lancaster, in the County Palatine of Lancaster.}}

| {{|Criminal Law (No. 2) Act 1782|public|58|27-11-1781|note3=|repealed=y|archived=n| |note4=|note4= }}

| {{|Customs (No. 5) Act 1782|public|61|27-11-1781|note3=|repealed=y|archived=n|}}

| {{|Houses of Correction Act 1782|public|64|01-07-1782|note3=|repealed=y|archived=n|An Act for the amending and rendering more effectual the Laws in being relative to Houses of Correction.|note4= }}

| {{|Customs and Excise Act 1782|public|66|27-11-1781|note3=|repealed=y|archived=n| |note4= }}

| {{|Appropriation Act 1782|public|67|27-11-1781|note3=|repealed=y|archived=n| |note4= }}

| {{|John Whitehill, Esquire Act 1782|public|69|01-07-1782|note3=|repealed=y|archived=n|An Act for compelling John Whitehill Esquire to return into this Kingdom; and for restraining him, in case of his Return, from going out of this Kingdom for a limited Time; and for discovering his Estate and Effects, and preventing the transporting or alienating of the same.|note4= }}

| {{|Importation Act (No. 4) 1782|public|72|27-11-1781|note3=|repealed=y|archived=n| |note4= }}

| {{|First Meetings of Commissioners etc. Act 1782|public|74|05-07-1782|repealed=y|archived=n|An Act for enlarging the Times appointed for the First Meetings of Commissioners or other Persons for putting in Execution certain Acts of this Session of Parliament. |note4= }}

| {{|Colonial Leave of Absence Act 1782|note1=|public|75|27-11-1781|note3=|repealed=y|archived=n|}}

| {{|Loans of Exchequer Bills Act 1782|public|76|27-11-1781|note3=|repealed=y|archived=n| |note4= }}

| {{|London Hospitals Act 1782|public|77|05-07-1782|repealed=y|archived=n|An Act to render valid and effectual certain Articles of Agreement between the Mayor and Commonalty and Citizens of the City of London, Governors of the Possessions, Revenues and Goods of the Hospitals of Edward King of England the Sixth, of Christ, Bridewell and Saint Thomas the Apostle, and of the Hospitals of Henry the Eighth, King of England, called, The House of the Poor in West Smithfield, near London, and of the House and Hospital called Bethelem, and the Presidents, Treasurers and acting Governors of the said several Hospitals.}}

| {{|Importation (No. 5) Act 1782|public|78|27-11-1781|note3=|repealed=y|archived=n|}}

| {{|Civil List and Secret Service Money Act 1782|public|82|27-11-1781|note3=|repealed=y|archived=n|An Act for enabling his Majesty to discharge the Debt contracted upon his Civil List Revenues, and for preventing the same from being in arrear for the future, by regulating the mode of Payments out of the said Revenues, and by suppressing or regulating certain Offices therein mentioned, which are now paid out of the Revenues of the Civil List.|note4= }}

| {{|London: Streets Act 1782|public|84|27-11-1781|note3=|repealed=y|archived=n|}}

| {{|Limehouse, Stepney: Streets Act 1782|public|87|27-11-1781|note3=|repealed=y|archived=n|}}

| {{|Lancaster and Westmorland Roads Act 1782|public|88|27-11-1781|note3=|repealed=y|archived=n|}}

| {{|Holderness to Beverley Road Act 1782|public|90|27-11-1781|note3=|repealed=y|archived=n|}}

| {{|Hertford Roads Act 1782|public|91|27-11-1781|note3=|repealed=y|archived=n|}}

| {{|Lincoln and Nottinghamshire Roads Act 1782|public|94|27-11-1781|note3=|repealed=y|archived=n|}}

| {{|Kent Roads Act 1782|public|98|27-11-1781|note3=|repealed=y|archived=n|}}

| {{|Hereford and Worcester Roads Act 1782|public|100|27-11-1781|note3=|repealed=y|archived=n|}}

| {{|Cornwall Roads Act 1782|public|104|27-11-1781|note3=|repealed=y|archived=n|}}

| {{|Hereford Roads Act 1782|public|108|27-11-1781|note3=|repealed=y|archived=n|}}

| {{|Dorset Roads Act 1782|public|101|27-11-1781|note3=|repealed=y|archived=n|}}

| {{|Kent Roads Act 1782|public|102|27-11-1781|note3=|repealed=y|archived=n|}}

| {{|Derby and Chester Roads Act 1782|public|107|27-11-1781|note3=|repealed=y|archived=n|}}

| {{|Hill to Lyde Way Road Act 1782|public|109|27-11-1781|note3=|repealed=y|archived=n|}}

| {{|Hereford Roads Act 1782|public|112|27-11-1781|note3=|repealed=y|archived=n|}}

| {{|Malt Duties Act 1782|public|3|27-11-1781|note3=|repealed=y|archived=n|}}

| {{|Marine Mutiny Act 1782|public|5|27-11-1781|note3=|repealed=y|archived=n|}}

| {{|Militia Act 1782|public|6|27-11-1781|note3=|repealed=y|archived=n|}}

| {{|Militia (No. 2) Act 1782|public|62|27-11-1781|note3=|repealed=y|archived=n|}}

| {{|Militia Pay Act 1782|public|24|27-11-1781|note3=|repealed=y|archived=n|}}

| {{|Mutiny Act 1782|public|4|27-11-1781|note3=|repealed=y|archived=n|}}

| {{|National Debt Act 1782|public|8|27-11-1781|note3=|repealed=y|archived=n|}}

| {{|National Debt (No. 2) Act 1782|public|34|27-11-1781|note3=|repealed=y|archived=n|}}

| {{|Navigation Act 1782|public|16|27-11-1781|note3=|repealed=y|archived=n|}}

| {{|Negotiations of Certain Bonds Act 1782|public|11|27-11-1781|note3=|repealed=y|archived=n|}}

| {{|Oakhampton Roads Act 1782|public|92|27-11-1781|note3=|repealed=y|archived=n|}}

| {{|Papists Act 1782|public|23|27-11-1781|note3=|repealed=y|archived=n|}}

| {{|Parliament Act 1782 (22. Geo. 3. c. 29)|public|29|27-11-1781|note3=|repealed=y|archived=n|}}

| {{|Parliament Act 1782|note1= (also known as Crewe's Act)|public|41|27-11-1781|note3=|repealed=y|archived=n|}}

| {{|Parliamentary Elections, Cricklade Act 1782|public|31|27-11-1781|note3=|repealed=y|archived=n|}}

| {{|Paymaster General Act 1782|public|81|27-11-1781|note3=|repealed=y|archived=n|}}

| {{|Plymouth Fortifications Act 1782|public|12|27-11-1781|note3=|repealed=y|archived=n|}}

| {{|Portman Square: Improvement Act 1782|public|85|27-11-1781|note3=|repealed=y|archived=n|}}

| {{|Portsmouth, Chatham Fortifications Act 1782|public|80|27-11-1781|note3=|repealed=y|archived=n|}}

| {{|Postage Act 1782|public|70|27-11-1781|note3=|repealed=y|archived=n|}}

| {{|Prize Act 1782|public|15|27-11-1781|note3=|repealed=y|archived=n|}}

| {{|Prize (No. 2) Act 1782|public|25|27-11-1781|note3=|repealed=y|archived=n|}}

| {{|Quarters for Certain Troops Act 1782|public|26|27-11-1781|note3=|repealed=y|archived=n|}}

| {{|Radnor Roads Act 1782|public|113|27-11-1781|note3=|repealed=y|archived=n|}}

| {{|Relief of the Poor Act 1782|public|83|27-11-1781|note3=|repealed=y|archived=n|}}

| {{|Repeal of Act for Securing Dependence of Ireland Act 1782|public|53|27-11-1781|note3=|repealed=y|archived=n|}}

| {{|Saint Luke (Finsbury), Middlesex (Poor Relief etc.) Act 1782|public|56|27-11-1781|note3=|repealed=y|archived=n|}}

| {{|Salop: Small Debts Act 1782|public|37|27-11-1781|note3=|repealed=y|archived=n|}}

| {{|Salt Duties Act 1782|public|39|27-11-1781|note3=|repealed=y|archived=n|}}

| {{|Seducing Certain Artificers to go Beyond Sea, etc. Act 1782|public|60|27-11-1781|note3=|repealed=y|archived=n|}}

| {{|Shoreditch to Stamford Hill Road Act 1782|public|115|27-11-1781|note3=|repealed=y|archived=n|}}

| {{|Sir Thomas Rumbold and another Act 1782|public|54|27-11-1781|note3=|repealed=y|archived=n|}}

| {{|Sir Thomas Rumbold and another (No. 2) Act 1782|public|59|27-11-1781|note3=|repealed=y|archived=n|}}

| {{|Small Debts, Kent Act 1782|public|27|27-11-1781|note3=|repealed=y|archived=n|}}

| {{|Spitalfields: Improvement Act 1782|public|43|27-11-1781|note3=|repealed=y|archived=n|}}

| {{|Stafford and Derby Roads Act 1782|public|116|27-11-1781|note3=|repealed=y|archived=n|}}

| {{|Stafford Worcester and Warwick Roads Act 1782|public|96|27-11-1781|note3=|repealed=y|archived=n|}}

| {{|Stamp Duties Act 1782|public|33|27-11-1781|note3=|repealed=y|archived=n|}}

| {{|Stourbridge Canal Act 1782|public|14|27-11-1781|note3=|repealed=y|archived=n|}}

| {{|Strand, London: Improvement Act 1782|public|65|27-11-1781|note3=|repealed=y|archived=n|}}

| {{|Supply of Ships to Enemies Act 1782|public|71|27-11-1781|note3=|repealed=y|archived=n|}}

| {{|Sussex Roads Act 1782|public|114|27-11-1781|note3=|repealed=y|archived=n|}}

| {{|Tamworth Roads Act 1782|public|99|27-11-1781|note3=|repealed=y|archived=n|}}

| {{|Tarporley to Weverham Road Act 1782|public|106|27-11-1781|note3=|repealed=y|archived=n|}}

| {{|Taxation Act 1782|public|68|27-11-1781|note3=|repealed=y|archived=n|}}

| {{|Tenbury Roads Act 1782|public|103|27-11-1781|note3=|repealed=y|archived=n|}}

| {{|Tobacco Act 1782|note1=|public|73|27-11-1781|note3=|repealed=y|archived=n|}}

| {{|Truce with America Act 1782|public|46|27-11-1781|note3=|repealed=y|archived=n|}}

| {{|Truro Roads Act 1782|public|89|27-11-1781|note3=|repealed=y|archived=n|}}

| {{|Use of Highland Dress Act 1782|note1= also known as Dress Act 1746|public|63|27-11-1781|note3=|repealed=y|archived=n|}}

| {{|Volunteers Act 1782|public|79|27-11-1781|note3=|repealed=y|archived=n|}}

| {{|Wapping, Stepney: Improvement Act 1782|public|86|27-11-1781|note3=|repealed=y|archived=n|}}

| {{|Wapping, Stepney: Poor Relief Act 1782|public|35|27-11-1781|note3=|repealed=y|archived=n|}}

| {{|Westminster: Streets Act 1782|public|44|27-11-1781|note3=|repealed=y|archived=n|}}

| {{|Westmorland Roads Act 1782|public|111|27-11-1781|note3=|repealed=y|archived=n|}}

| {{|Wiltshire and Southampton Roads Act 1782|public|110|27-11-1781|note3=|repealed=y|archived=n|}}

| {{|Worcester Roads Act 1782|public|95|27-11-1781|note3=|repealed=y|archived=n|}}

| {{|Wrexham to Barnhill Road Act 1782|public|105|27-11-1781|note3=|repealed=y|archived=n|}}

| {{|Yarmouth Coal Import Duties (Privileges of Freemen, etc.) Act 1782|public|22|27-11-1781|note3=|repealed=y|archived=n|}}

| {{|Yorkshire Roads Act 1782|public|97|27-11-1781|note3=|repealed=y|archived=n|}}

| {{|Yorkshire and Durham Roads Act 1782|public|93|27-11-1781|note3=|repealed=y|archived=n|}}

}}

1783

23 Geo. 3

| {{|American Loyalists Act 1783|public|80|05-12-1782|note3=|repealed=y|archived=n|}}

| {{|Annuity to Lord Rodney Act 1783|public|86|05-12-1782|note3=|repealed=y|archived=n|}}

| {{|Annuity to Sir George Augustus Elliott Act 1783|public|85|05-12-1782|note3=|repealed=y|archived=n|}}

| {{|Appropriation Act 1783|public|78|05-12-1782|note3=|repealed=y|archived=n|}}

| {{|Attainder of David Ogilvy: Disabilities Removed on Pardon Act 1783|public|34|05-12-1782|note3=|repealed=y|archived=n|}}

| {{|Auditing of the Public Accounts Act 1783|public|68|05-12-1782|note3=|repealed=y|archived=n|}}

| {{|Bedford Level Act 1783|public|25|05-12-1782|note3=|repealed=y|archived=n|}}

| {{|Berkshire Roads Act 1783|public|100|05-12-1782|note3=|repealed=y|archived=n|}}

| {{|Birmingham Canal, Navigation Act 1783|public|92|05-12-1782|note3=|repealed=y|archived=n|}}

| {{|Birmingham: Poor Relief Act 1783|public|54|05-12-1782|note3=|repealed=y|archived=n|}}

| {{|Bounties Act 1783|public|21|05-12-1782|note3=|repealed=y|archived=n|}}

| {{|Bounty to Garrison of Gibraltar Act 1783|public|16|05-12-1782|note3=|repealed=y|archived=n|}}

| {{|Bridewell Hospital Act 1783|public|27|05-12-1782|note3=|repealed=y|archived=n|}}

| {{|Bushey Heath to Aylesbury Road Act 1783|public|93|05-12-1782|note3=|repealed=y|archived=n|}}

| {{|Canterbury to Whitstable Road Act 1783|public|97|05-12-1782|note3=|repealed=y|archived=n|}}

| {{|Chester and Stafford Roads Act 1783|public|101|05-12-1782|note3=|repealed=y|archived=n|}}

| {{|City Streets Act 1783|public|46|05-12-1782|note3=|repealed=y|archived=n|}}

| {{|Clerkenwell: Poor Relief Act 1783|public|44|05-12-1782|note3=|repealed=y|archived=n|}}

| {{|Coffee and Cocoa-nuts Act 1783|public|79|05-12-1782|note3=|repealed=y|archived=n|}}

| {{|Continuance of Laws Act 1783|public|6|05-12-1782|note3=|repealed=y|archived=n|}}

| {{|Cumberland and Westmorland Roads Act 1783|public|108|05-12-1782|note3=|repealed=y|archived=n|}}

| {{|Customs Act 1783|public|11|05-12-1782|note3=|repealed=y|archived=n|}}

| {{|Customs (No. 2) Act 1783|public|56|05-12-1782|note3=|repealed=y|archived=n|}}

| {{|Customs (No. 3) Act 1783|public|74|05-12-1782|note3=|repealed=y|archived=n|}}

| {{|Duties on Smalts, etc. Act 1783|public|75|05-12-1782|note3=|repealed=y|archived=n|}}

| {{|Duties on Waggons, etc. Act 1783|public|66|05-12-1782|note3=|repealed=y|archived=n|}}

| {{|Duties on Wines, etc. Act 1783|public|76|05-12-1782|note3=|repealed=y|archived=n|}}

| {{|Dyeing Trade (Frauds) Act 1783|note1=|public|15|05-12-1782|note3=|repealed=y|archived=n|}}

| {{|East India Company Act 1783|public|36|05-12-1782|note3=|repealed=y|archived=n|}}

| {{|East India Company (No. 2) Act 1783|public|83|05-12-1782|note3=|repealed=y|archived=n|}}

| {{|Egyptians Act 1783|public|51|05-12-1782|note3=|repealed=y|archived=n|}}

| {{|Excise Act 1783|public|70|05-12-1782|note3=|repealed=y|archived=n|}}

| {{|Exportation Act 1783|public|81|05-12-1782|note3=|repealed=y|archived=n|}}

| {{|Failure of Corn Crop (Scotland) Act 1783|public|53|05-12-1782|note3=|repealed=y|archived=n|}}

| {{|Flax, etc., Manufacture Act 1783|public|77|05-12-1782|note3=|repealed=y|archived=n|}}

| {{|Forehoe, Norfolk (Borrowing Powers of Guardians) Act 1783|public|29|05-12-1782|note3=|repealed=y|archived=n|}}

| {{|Gloucester Roads. Act 1783|public|104|05-12-1782|note3=|repealed=y|archived=n|}}

| {{|Gloucestershire Roads Act 1783|public|106|05-12-1782|note3=|repealed=y|archived=n|}}

| {{|Hatfield Chase Act 1783|public|13|05-12-1782|note3=|repealed=y|archived=n|}}

| {{|Importation Act 1783|public|1|05-12-1782|note3=|repealed=y|archived=n|}}

| {{|Importation (No. 2) Act 1783|public|9|05-12-1782|note3=|repealed=y|archived=n|}}

| {{|Importation (No. 3) Act 1783|public|10|05-12-1782|note3=|repealed=y|archived=n|}}

| {{|Importation (No. 4) Act 1783|public|14|05-12-1782|note3=|repealed=y|archived=n|}}

| {{|Indemnity Act 1783|public|30|05-12-1782|note3=|repealed=y|archived=n|}}

| {{|Irish Appeals Act 1783|public|28|05-12-1782|note3=|repealed=y|archived=n|}}

| {{|John Whitehill, Esquire Act 1783|public|19|05-12-1782|note3=|repealed=y|archived=n|}}

| {{|Justiciary and Circuit Courts (Scotland) Act 1783|note1=|public|45|05-12-1782|note3=|repealed=y|archived=n|}}

| {{|King's Bench Prison: Poor Relief Act 1783|public|23|05-12-1782|note3=|repealed=y|archived=n|}}

| {{|Kingston-upon-Hull: Improvement Act 1783|public|55|05-12-1782|note3=|repealed=y|archived=n|}}

| {{|Land Tax Act 1783|public|3|05-12-1782|note3=|repealed=y|archived=n|}}

| {{|Lands of Earl of Pembroke Act 1783|public|61|05-12-1782|note3=|repealed=y|archived=n|}}

| {{|Leeds and Halifax Roads Act 1783|public|94|05-12-1782|note3=|repealed=y|archived=n|}}

| {{|Leeds and Liverpool Canal Act 1783|public|47|05-12-1782|note3=|repealed=y|archived=n|}}

| {{|Leicester Roads Act 1783|public|107|05-12-1782|note3=|repealed=y|archived=n|}}

| {{|Loans or Exchequer Bills Act 1783|public|12|05-12-1782|note3=|repealed=y|archived=n|}}

| {{|Loans or Exchequer Bills (No. 2) Act 1783|public|72|05-12-1782|note3=|repealed=y|archived=n|}}

| {{|Loans or Exchequer Bills (No. 3) Act 1783|public|84|05-12-1782|note3=|repealed=y|archived=n|}}

| {{|London City Road Act 1783|public|102|05-12-1782|note3=|repealed=y|archived=n|}}

| {{|Malt Duties Act 1783|public|4|05-12-1782|note3=|repealed=y|archived=n|}}

| {{|Malt Duties (No. 2) Act 1783|public|64|05-12-1782|note3=|repealed=y|archived=n|}}

| {{|Marine Mutiny Act 1783|public|7|05-12-1782|note3=|repealed=y|archived=n|}}

| {{|Marylebone Road Act 1783|public|110|05-12-1782|note3=|repealed=y|archived=n|}}

| {{|Militia Pay Act 1783|public|40|05-12-1782|note3=|repealed=y|archived=n|}}

| {{|Mutiny Act 1783|public|17|05-12-1782|note3=|repealed=y|archived=n|}}

| {{|Mutiny (No. 2) Act 1783|public|24|05-12-1782|note3=|repealed=y|archived=n|}}

| {{|Mutiny (No. 3) Act 1783|public|52|05-12-1782|note3=|repealed=y|archived=n|}}

| {{|National Debt Act 1783|public|35|05-12-1782|note3=|repealed=y|archived=n|}}

| {{|Papists Act 1783|public|22|05-12-1782|note3=|repealed=y|archived=n|}}

| {{|Paymaster-General Act 1783|public|50|05-12-1782|note3=|repealed=y|archived=n|}}

| {{|Payment of Creditors (Scotland) Act 1783|public|18|05-12-1782|note3=|repealed=y|archived=n|}}

| {{|Portsmouth, Chatham Fortifications Act 1783|public|71|05-12-1782|note3=|repealed=y|archived=n|}}

| {{|Portsmouth, Faversham Fortifications Act 1783|public|87|05-12-1782|note3=|repealed=y|archived=n|}}

| {{|Postage Act 1783|public|69|05-12-1782|note3=|repealed=y|archived=n|}}

| {{|Prize Act 1783|public|57|05-12-1782|note3=|repealed=y|archived=n|}}

| {{|Receipt of the Exchequer Act 1783|public|82|05-12-1782|note3=|repealed=y|archived=n|}}

| {{|Recruiting Act 1783|public|37|05-12-1782|note3=|repealed=y|archived=n|}}

| {{|Rogues and Vagabonds Act 1783|public|88|05-12-1782|note3=|repealed=y|archived=n|}}

| {{|Rotherhithe: Streets Act 1783|public|31|05-12-1782|note3=|repealed=y|archived=n|}}

| {{|Shrewsbury, Guildhall Act 1783|public|20|05-12-1782|note3=|repealed=y|archived=n|}}

| {{|Shrewsbury: Small Debts Act 1783|public|73|05-12-1782|note3=|repealed=y|archived=n|}}

| {{|Sir Thomas Rumbold and another Act 1783|public|5|05-12-1782|note3=|repealed=y|archived=n|}}

| {{|Sir Thomas Rumbold and another (No. 2) Act 1783|public|59|05-12-1782|note3=|repealed=y|archived=n|}}

| {{|Sir Thomas Rumbold and another (No. 3) Act 1783|public|60|05-12-1782|note3=|repealed=y|archived=n|}}

| {{|Somerset Roads Act 1783|public|96|05-12-1782|note3=|repealed=y|archived=n|}}

| {{|Southampton Roads Act 1783|public|109|05-12-1782|note3=|repealed=y|archived=n|}}

| {{|Stafford and Chester Roads Act 1783|public|99|05-12-1782|note3=|repealed=y|archived=n|}}

| {{|Stafford and Salop Roads Act 1783|public|105|05-12-1782|note3=|repealed=y|archived=n|}}

| {{|Stage Coach, etc., Duty Act 1783|public|63|05-12-1782|note3=|repealed=y|archived=n|}}

| {{|Stamp Duties Act 1783 (23 Geo. 3. c. 49)|public|49|05-12-1782|note3=|repealed=y|archived=n|}}

| {{|Stamp Duties Act 1783 (23 Geo. 3. c. 58)|public|58|05-12-1782|note3=|repealed=y|archived=n|}}

| {{|Stamp Duties Act 1783 (23 Geo. 3. c. 62)|public|62|05-12-1782|note3=|repealed=y|archived=n|}}

| {{|Stamp Duties Act 1783|public|67|05-12-1782|note3=|repealed=y|archived=n|}}

| {{|Supply of Ships to Enemies Act 1783|public|2|05-12-1782|note3=|repealed=y|archived=n|}}

| {{|Thames Ballastage Act 1783|public|8|05-12-1782|note3=|repealed=y|archived=n|}}

| {{|Thames and Severn Canal Act 1783|public|38|05-12-1782|note3=|repealed=y|archived=n|}}

| {{|Trade with America Act 1783|public|26|05-12-1782|note3=|repealed=y|archived=n|}}

| {{|Trade with America (No. 2) Act 1783|public|39|05-12-1782|note3=|repealed=y|archived=n|}}

| {{|Trent and Mersey Canal Act 1783|public|33|05-12-1782|note3=|repealed=y|archived=n|}}

| {{|Trent, Navigation Act 1783|public|41|05-12-1782|note3=|repealed=y|archived=n|}}

| {{|Trent Navigation Act 1783|public|48|05-12-1782|note3=|repealed=y|archived=n|}}

| {{|Wapping, Stepney: Poor Relief, etc. Act 1783|public|32|05-12-1782|note3=|repealed=y|archived=n|}}

| {{|Westminster: Streets Act 1783|public|42|05-12-1782|note3=|repealed=y|archived=n|}}

| {{|Westminster: Streets (No. 2) Act 1783|public|43|05-12-1782|note3=|repealed=y|archived=n|}}

| {{|Westminster: Streets (No. 3) Act 1783|public|89|05-12-1782|note3=|repealed=y|archived=n|}}

| {{|Westminster: Streets (No. 4) Act 1783|public|90|05-12-1782|note3=|repealed=y|archived=n|}}

| {{|Wetherby to Knaresborough Road Act 1783|public|103|05-12-1782|note3=|repealed=y|archived=n|}}

| {{|Whitechapel: Streets Act 1783|public|91|05-12-1782|note3=|repealed=y|archived=n|}}

| {{|Wiltshire Roads Act 1783|public|111|05-12-1782|note3=|repealed=y|archived=n|}}

| {{|Worcester Roads Act 1783|public|98|05-12-1782|note3=|repealed=y|archived=n|}}

| {{|Yorkshire Roads Act 1783|public|95|05-12-1782|note3=|repealed=y|archived=n|}}

}}

24 Geo. 3 Sess. 1

| {{|Trade with America Act 1783|public|2|11-11-1783|note3=|repealed=y|archived=n|}}

| {{|East India Company Act 1783|public|3|11-11-1783|note3=|repealed=y|archived=n|}}

| {{|Land Tax Act 1783|public|4|11-11-1783|note3=|repealed=y|archived=n|}}

| {{|Borrowstouness Canal Act 1783|public|5|11-11-1783|note3=|repealed=y|archived=n|}}

| {{|Postage Act 1783|public|6|11-11-1783|note3=|repealed=y|archived=n|}}

| {{|Bills of Exchange, etc. Act 1783|public|7|11-11-1783|note3=|repealed=y|archived=n|}}

| {{|Kent: Small Debts Act 1783|public|8|11-11-1783|note3=|repealed=y|archived=n|}}

| {{|Norfolk: Drainage Act 1783|public|9|11-11-1783|note3=|repealed=y|archived=n|}}

| {{|Land Tax Act 1783|public|10|11-11-1783|note3=|repealed=y|archived=n|}}

| {{|Mutiny Act 1783|public|11|11-11-1783|note3=|repealed=y|archived=n|}}

| {{|Removal of Prisoners, etc. Act 1783|public|12|11-11-1783|note3=|repealed=y|archived=n|}}

| {{|Militia Pay, etc. Act 1783|public|13|11-11-1783|note3=|repealed=y|archived=n|}}

| {{|Exportation Act 1783|public|14|11-11-1783|note3=|repealed=y|archived=n|}}

| {{|Trade with America Act 1783|public|15|11-11-1783|note3=|repealed=y|archived=n|}}

| {{|Papists Act 1783|public|16|11-11-1783|note3=|repealed=y|archived=n|}}

| {{|Marine Mutiny Act 1783|public|17|11-11-1783|note3=|repealed=y|archived=n|}}

| {{|Edinburgh Roads Act 1783|public|18|11-11-1783|note3=|repealed=y|archived=n|}}

| {{|Isle of Wight, Carriage Rates Act 1783|public|19|11-11-1783|note3=|repealed=y|archived=n|}}

| {{|Bradford-on-Avon (Additional Overseer) Act 1783|public|20|11-11-1783|note3=|repealed=y|archived=n|}}

| {{|Newhaven Bridge Act 1783|public|21|11-11-1783|note3=|repealed=y|archived=n|}}

| {{|Shillingford Oxford: Roads and Bridge Act 1783|public|22|11-11-1783|note3=|repealed=y|archived=n|}}

| {{|Kirby Kendal to Kirkby Ireleth Road Act 1783|public|23|11-11-1783|note3=|repealed=y|archived=n|}}

| {{|Nottinghamshire and Derby Roads Act 1783|public|24|11-11-1783|note3=|repealed=y|archived=n|}}

| {{|Hertford Roads Act 1783|public|25|11-11-1783|note3=|repealed=y|archived=n|}}

| {{|Devon Roads Act 1783|public|26|11-11-1783|note3=|repealed=y|archived=n|}}

| {{|Cornwall Roads Act 1783|public|27|11-11-1783|note3=|repealed=y|archived=n|}}

| {{|Northamptonshire Roads Act 1783|public|28|11-11-1783|note3=|repealed=y|archived=n|}}

| {{|Yorkshire Roads Act 1783|public|29|11-11-1783|note3=|repealed=y|archived=n|}}

| {{|Wiltshire Roads Act 1783|public|30|11-11-1783|note3=|repealed=y|archived=n|}}

| {{|Barnstaple Roads Act 1783|public|31|11-11-1783|note3=|repealed=y|archived=n|}}

| {{|Cosham to Chichester Road Act 1783|public|32|11-11-1783|note3=|repealed=y|archived=n|}}

| {{|Carmarthen Roads Act 1783|public|33|11-11-1783|note3=|repealed=y|archived=n|}}

| {{|Lincoln Roads Act 1783|public|34|11-11-1783|note3=|repealed=y|archived=n|}}

}}

1784 (24 Geo. 3 Sess. 2)

| {{|Appropriation Act 1784|public|44|18-05-1784|note3=|repealed=y|archived=n|}}

| {{|Audit of Public Accounts Act 1784|public|13|18-05-1784|note3=|repealed=y|archived=n|}}

| {{|Bank of England Act 1784|public|32|18-05-1784|note3=|repealed=y|archived=n|}}

| {{|Bank of Scotland Act 1784|public|12|18-05-1784|note3=|repealed=y|archived=n|}}

| {{|Birmingham Canal, Navigation Act 1784|public|4|18-05-1784|note3=|repealed=y|archived=n|}}

| {{|Bounty for Taking L'Amazone Act 1784|public|28|18-05-1784|note3=|repealed=y|archived=n|}}

}}
 Composition for a Crown Debt Act 1784 c 14
 Crown Lands – Forfeited Estates Act 1784 c 57
 Customs Act 1784 c 9
 Customs Act 1784 c 16
 Customs Act 1784 c 49
 Customs, etc. Act 1784 c 7
 Devizs Roads Act 1784 c 65
 Devon Roads Act 1784 c 63
 Devon Roads Act 1784 c 67
 Duties on Bricks and Tiles Act 1784 c 24
 Duties on Candles Act 1784 c 36
 Duties on Certain Licences Act 1784 c 41
 Duties on Horses Act 1784 c 31
 Duties on Linens Act 1784 c 40
 Duties on Spirits Act 1784 c 46
 Duties on Starch and Soap Act 1784 c 48
 Duties upon Candles Act 1784 c 11
 East India Company Act 1784 c 2 c 2
 East India Company Act 1784 also known as Pitt's India Act c 25
 East India Company Act 1784 c 34 c 34
 Exercise of Trade by Soldiers, etc. Act 1784 c 6
 Exportation, etc. Act 1784 c 50
 Forth and Clyde: Navigation Act 1784 c 59
 Game Certificates Act 1784 c 43
 Gaols Act 1784 c 54
 Hackney Coaches Act 1784 c 27
 Hat Duties, etc. Act 1784 c 51
 Hat Manufacture Act 1784 c 21
 Hereford Roads Act 1784 c 69
 Houses of Correction Act 1784 c 55
 Indemnity Act 1784 c 58
 Lancashire Roads Act 1784 c 68
 Launceston: Poor Relief Act 1784 c 17
 Licences for Retailing Beer, etc. Act 1784 c 30
 Llandilo Rhynws Bridge Act 1784 c 66
 Loans or Exchequer Bills Act 1784 c 33
 Loans or Exchequer Bills Act 1784 c 52
 Manufacture of Leather Act 1784 c 19
 National Debt Act 1784 c 10
 National Debt Act 1784 c 37
 National Debt Act 1784 c 39
 Ordination of Aliens Act 1784 c 35
 Paper Duties Act 1784 c 18
 Pawnbrokers Act 1784 c 42
 Plate Assay (Sheffield) Act 1784 c 20
 Plate Duties Act 1784 c 53
 Portsmouth, Plymouth Fortifications Act 1784 c 29
 Postage Act 1784 c 8
 Recess Elections Act 1784 c 26
 Sale by Lottery of Sir Ashton Lever's Museum Act 1784 c 22
 Sheffield Market Place Act 1784 c 5
 Shrewsbury: Poor Relief Act 1784 c 15
 Smuggling Act 1784 c 47
 Stepney: Poor Relief, etc. Act 1784 c 60
 Commutation Act 1784  also known as Taxation Act 1784 c 38
 Totnes Roads Act 1784 c 64
 Trade with America Act 1784 c 1
 Trade with America Act 1784 c 23
 Trade with British America Act 1784 c 45
 Transportation, etc. Act 1784 c 56
 Westmorland and Yorkshire Roads Act 1784 c 70
 Woodstock Oxford Roads Act 1784 c 61
 Woollen Manufactures, Suffolk Act 1784 c 3

1785 (25 Geo. 3)

| {{|American Loyalists Act 1785|public|76|25-01-1785|note3=|repealed=y|archived=n|}}

| {{|Annuity to Duke of Gloucester Act 1785|public|53|25-01-1785|note3=|repealed=y|archived=n|}}

| {{|Appropriation, etc. Act 1785|public|60|25-01-1785|note3=|repealed=y|archived=n|}}

| {{|Arun, Sussex: Navigation Act 1785|public|100|25-01-1785|note3=|repealed=y|archived=n|}}

| {{|Arundel: Improvement Act 1785|public|90|25-01-1785|note3=|repealed=y|archived=n|}}

| {{|Audit of Public Accounts Act 1785|public|52|25-01-1785|note3=|repealed=y|archived=n|}}

| {{|Audit of Public Accounts Act 1785|public|68|25-01-1785|note3=|repealed=y|archived=n|}}

| {{|Ayr Bridge Act 1785|public|37|25-01-1785|note3=|repealed=y|archived=n|}}

}}
 Banbury to Lutterworth Road Act 1785 c 128
 Bancroft's Patent Act 1785 c 38
 Bank of England Act 1785 c 83
 Bermondsey, etc. : Streets Act 1785 c 23
 Beverley to Kexby Bridge Road Act 1785 c 110
 Bideford Roads Act 1785 c 119
 Birmingham Canal: Navigation Act 1785 c 99
 Bounties for Destroying Spanish Ships Act 1785 c 29
 Bridport: Improvement Act 1785 c 91
 Buckingham and Oxford Roads Act 1785 c 127
 Cheltenham Roads Act 1785 c 125
 City of London: Improvement Act 1785 c 97
 Civil List Act 1785 c 61
 Clapham: Streets Act 1785 c 88
 Cordage for Shipping Act 1785 c 56
 Cornwall Roads Act 1785 c 108
 Cornwall Roads Act 1785 c 114
 Cromarty Harbour Act 1785 c 39
 Crown Debtors Act 1785 c 35
 Crown Lands at North Scotland Yard, Middlesex Act 1785 c 98
 Customs Act 1785 c 25
 Customs Act 1785 c 69
 Debtors, Middlesex Act 1785 c 45
 Derby Roads Act 1785 c 121
 Doncaster Roads Act 1785 c 104
 Dudley Canal Act 1785 c 87
 Dumfries Roads Act 1785 c 120
 Duties on Bricks and Tiles Act 1785 c 66
 Duties on Coachmakers' Licences, etc. Act 1785 c 49
 Duties on Coals, etc. Act 1785 c 54
 Duties on Linens Act 1785 c 72
 Duties on Post Horses, etc. Act 1785 c 51
 Duties on Servants Act 1785 c 43
 Duties on Servants Act 1785 c 70
 Duties on Shops Act 1785 c 30
 Duties on Tobacco Act 1785 c 81
 Edinburgh: Streets Act 1785 also known as the South Bridge Act 1785 c 28
 Excise Act 1785 c 22
 Excise Act 1785 c 47
 Excise Act 1785 c 74
 Exeter: Poor Relief Act 1785 c 21
 Exportation Act 1785 c 62
 Exportation Act 1785 c 67
 Fires Prevention Act 1785 also known as the Fires Prevention (Metropolis) Act 1785 c 77
 Fisheries Act 1785 c 65
 Game Certificates Act 1785 c 50
 Glamorgan Roads Act 1785 c 122
 Gloucester Gaol Act 1785 c 10
 Glove Duties Act 1785 c 55
 Great Yarmouth: Improvement Act 1785 c 36
 Hawkers Act 1785 c 78
 Holy Trinity Church, Bristol Act 1785 c 95
 Huntingdon: Improvement Act 1785 c 9
 Indemnity Act 1785 c 82
 Inquiry into Fees, Public Offices Act 1785 c 19
 Insurances on Ships, etc. Act 1785 c 44
 Kent Roads Act 1785 c 103
 Kent Roads Act 1785 c 112
 Kidderminster Church Act 1785 c 94
 Lambeth Waterworks Act 1785 c 89
 Lancaster Roads Act 1785 c 106
 Land Tax Act 1785 c 4
 Land Tax Act 1785 c 20
 Leicester Roads Act 1785 c 113
 Lincoln: Drainage Act 1785 c 14
 Lincoln Roads Act 1785 c 123
 Liverpool Harbour Act 1785 c 15
 Loans or Exchequer Bills Act 1785 c 11
 Loans or Exchequer Bills Act 1785 c 12
 Loans or Exchequer Bills Act 1785 c 33
 Lord Dundonald's Patent (Tar, Pitch, etc.) Act 1785 c 42
 Lottery Act 1785 c 59
 Malt Duties Act 1785 c 2
 Marine Mutiny Act 1785 c 3
 Medicine Duties Act 1785 c 79
 Middlesex and Essex Roads Act 1785 c 124
 Militia Pay Act 1785 c 8
 Mutiny Act 1785 c 6
 National Debt Act 1785 c 32
 National Debt Act 1785 c 71
 Newgate Gaol Delivery Act 1785 c 18
 Nottinghamshire Roads Act 1785 c 107
 Parliamentary Elections Act 1785 c 84
 Pawnbrokers Act 1785 c 48
 Perth: Highways and Bridge Act 1785 c 13
 Pilchard Fishery Act 1785 c 58
 Plate (Duties, Drawbacks) Act 1785 c 64
 Ramsgate: Streets Act 1785 c 34
 Reading: Streets Act 1785 c 85
 Repeal of Certain Duties Act 1785 c 24
 Richmond: Poor Relief, etc. Act 1785 c 41
 Rotherham Roads Act 1785 c 105
 Saint Catherine, Tower of London: Watching, etc. Act 1785 c 86
 Saint John in Beverley and Skidby, Yorkshire: Drainage Act 1785 c 92
 Salisbury: Improvement Act 1785 c 93
 Salop Radnor and Montgomery Roads Act 1785 c 118
 Salop Roads Act 1785 c 101
 Salop Roads Act 1785 c 102
 Salt Duties Act 1785 c 63
 Shoreditch Streets Act 1785 c 96
 Small Debts, Kent Act 1785 c 7
 Southampton Roads Act 1785 c 126
 Stamp Duties Act 1785 c 75
 Stamps Act 1785 c 80
 Suffolk Roads Act 1785 c 116
 Sunderland Harbour Act 1785 c 26
 Sussex Roads Act 1785 c 109
 Surrey and Sussex Roads Act 1785 c 117
 Trade Act 1785 c 1
 Trade with America Act 1785 c 5
 Transportation, etc. Act 1785 c 46
 Treasurer of the Navy Act 1785 c 31
 Trial of a Certain Election Act 1785 c 17
 Tunstead and Happing, Norfolk: Poor Relief Act 1785 c 27
 Turnpike Toll Act 1785 c 57
 Uxbridge: Streets Act 1785 c 16
 Warwick Roads Act 1785 c 115
 Whitby Roads Act 1785 c 111
 Woollen, etc., Manufactures, Bedfordshire Act 1785 c 40

1786 (26 Geo. 3)

 
| {{|All Saints' Church, Newcastle Act 1786|public|117|24-01-1786|note3=|repealed=y|archived=n|}}

| {{|Alloa Harbour Act 1786|public|13|24-01-1786|note3=|repealed=y|archived=n|}}

| {{|American Loyalists Act 1786|public|68|24-01-1786|note3=|repealed=y|archived=n|}}

| {{|Annuity to Brook Watson, Esquire Act 1786|public|93|24-01-1786|note3=|repealed=y|archived=n|}}

| {{|Annuity to Lady Maria Carlton Act 1786|public|88|24-01-1786|note3=|repealed=y|archived=n|}}

| {{|Appropriation Act 1786|public|61|24-01-1786|note3=|repealed=y|archived=n|}}

| {{|Audit of Public Accounts Act 1786|public|67|24-01-1786|note3=|repealed=y|archived=n|}}

| {{|Barking Act 1786|public|115|24-01-1786|note3=|repealed=y|archived=n|}}

| {{|Bedford and Hertford Roads Act 1786|public|130|24-01-1786|note3=|repealed=y|archived=n|}}

| {{|Birmingham and Chesterfield Roads Act 1786|public|149|24-01-1786|note3=|repealed=y|archived=n|}}

| {{|Birstal to Huddersfield Roads Act 1786|public|140|24-01-1786|note3=|repealed=y|archived=n|}}

| {{|Blackfriars Bridge (Sunday Tolls) Act 1786|public|37|24-01-1786|note3=|repealed=y|archived=n|}}

| {{|Bodmin Roads Act 1786|public|129|24-01-1786|note3=|repealed=y|archived=n|}}

| {{|Bounties for Destroying Spanish Ships Act 1786|public|35|24-01-1786|note3=|repealed=y|archived=n|}}

| {{|Bounty on Cordage Exported Act 1786|public|85|24-01-1786|note3=|repealed=y|archived=n|}}

| {{|Bristol Bridge Act 1786|public|111|24-01-1786|note3=|repealed=y|archived=n|}}

| {{|British Fisheries Society Act 1786|public|106|24-01-1786|note3=|repealed=y|archived=n|}}

}}

 Carmarthen Roads Act 1786 c 150
 Cheltenham: Streets Act 1786 c 116
 Cheshire Roads Act 1786 c 139
 Chesterfield to Worksop Road Act 1786 c 152
 Clyde Marine Society Act 1786 c 109
 Coal Trade, London Act 1786 c 83
 Coal Trade: Westminster Act 1786 c 108
 Consecration of Bishops Abroad Act 1786 c 84
 Continuance of Laws Act 1786 c 53
 Continuance of Laws Act 1786 c 80
 Coventry Canal Act 1786 c 20
 Coventry Canal Act 1786 c 30
 Crew of a Certain Foreign Vessel Act 1786 c 8
 Crewkerne Roads Act 1786 c 123
 Cromford Bridge to Langley Mill Road Act 1786 c 124
 Crown Land Revenues, etc. Act 1786 c 87
 Customs Act 1786 c 42
 Customs Act 1786 c 104
 Derby Roads Act 1786 c 151
 Dover Harbour Act 1786 c 11
 Dumbarton Roads and Bridges Act 1786 c 21
 Duties on Houses, etc. Act 1786 c 79
 Duties on Shops Act 1786 c 9
 Duties on Starch Act 1786 c 51
 East India Company Act 1786 c 16 c 16
 East India Company Act 1786 c 57
 East India Company (Money) Act 1786 c 62. Sometimes called the East India Company Stock Act 1786.
 Edinburgh: Improvement Act 1786 c 113
 Erection of Lighthouses Act 1786 c 101
 Exchequer Bills Act 1786 c 97
 Excise Act 1786 c 59
 Excise Act 1786 c 64
 Excise Act 1786 c 73
 Excise Act 1786 c 74
 Excise Act 1786 c 77
 Exportation Act 1786 c 2
 Exportation Act 1786 c 5
 Exportation Act 1786 c 76
 Exportation Act 1786 c 89
 Exports Act 1786 c 40
 Faversham, Portsmouth, Plymouth Fortifications Act 1786 c 94
 Fees, Officers of the Exchequer Act 1786 c 99
 First Meetings of Certain Commissioners Act 1786 c 95
 Fisheries Act 1786 c 41
 Fisheries Act 1786 c 81
 Forfeited Estates, Scotland Act 1786 c 27
 Fort William in Bengal Act 1786 c 25
 Great Torrington Roads Act 1786 c 128
 Hackney Coaches Act 1786 c 72
 Hemp and Flax Act 1786 c 43
 Hockliffe to Stony Stratford Road Act 1786 c 143
 House of Commons (Electors) Act 1786 c 100
 Imprisonment of Debtors, etc. Act 1786 c 38
 Indemnity Act 1786 c 98
 Inquiry into Fees, Public Offices Act 1786 c 66
 Kent Roads Act 1786 c 132
 Kent Roads Act 1786 c 134
 Kent Roads Act 1786 c 145
 Kent: Small Debts Act 1786 c 18
 Kent: Small Debts Act 1786 c 22
 Kent: Small Debts Act 1786 c 118
 Knackers Act 1786 c 71
 Land Tax Act 1786 c 3
 Land Tax Act 1786 c 54
 Land Tax Act 1786 c 103
 Land Tax Act 1786 c 105
 Land Tax Act 1786 c 121
 Lincoln and Rutland Roads Act 1786 c 159
 Lincoln Roads Act 1786 c 137
 Lincoln Roads Act 1786 c 138
 Lincoln Roads Act 1786 c 141
 Lincoln Roads Act 1786 c 146
 Liverpool: Improvement Act 1786 c 12
 Liverpool Rectory, 1786 c 15
 Liverpool to Preston Road Act 1786 c 126
 Loans or Exchequer Bills Act 1786 c 32
 Loans or Exchequer Bills Act 1786 c 33
 London: Coal Trade Act 1786 c 14
 Losses from Cession of East Florida Act 1786 c 75
 Lottery Act 1786 c 65
 Lymington Roads Act 1786 c 156
 Madhouses Act 1786 c 91
 Malt Duties Act 1786 c 6
 Marine Mutiny Act 1786 c 7
 Margate Theatre Act 1786 c 29
 Merchant Shipping Act 1786 c 86
 Middlesex Gaol Act 1786 c 55
 Militia Act 1786 c 107
 Militia Pay Act 1786 c 69
 Minehead Roads Act 1786 c 136
 Mutiny Act 1786 c 10
 National Debt Act 1786 c 34
 National Debt Reduction Act 1786 c 31
 Navy Act 1786 c 63
 Newcastle: Streets Act 1786 c 39
 Newcastle to Carlisle Road Act 1786 c 160
 Newfoundland Fisheries Act 1786 c 26
 Newport, Isle of Wight: Improvement Act 1786 c 119
 Norfolk Roads Act 1786 c 127
 North Shields: Water Supply Act 1786 c 110
 Oxford Canal Act 1786 c 20
 Paper Duties Act 1786 c 78
 Pilchard Fishery Act 1786 c 45
 Plymouth: Poor Relief Act 1786 c 19
 Proceedings Against Warren Hastings Act 1786 c 96
 Rectifying a Mistake in Chapter 61 Act 1786 c 70
 Relief and Debtors Act 1786 c 44
 Returns of Charitable Donations Act 1786 c 58
 Returns Relative to the Poor Act 1786 c 56
 Romford: Poor Relief Act 1786 c 28
 Salaries of Judges (Scotland) Act 1786 c 46
 Salt Duties, etc. Act 1786 c 36
 Salt Duties Act 1786 c 90
 Selby to Leeds Road Act 1786 c 155
 Shipping Act 1786 c 60
 Shrewsbury Gaol Act 1786 c 24
 South London Roads Act 1786 c 131
 Southampton Roads Act 1786 c 158
 Southern Whale Fishery Act 1786 c 50
 Southwark: Poor Relief Act 1786 c 114
 Southwark: Streets Act 1786 c 120
 Stafford and Chester Roads Act 1786 c 153
 Stamps Act 1786 c 48
 Stamps Act 1786 c 49
 Stamps Act 1786 c 82
 Sussex and Kent Roads Act 1786 c 157
 Sussex Roads Act 1786 c 147
 Tewkesbury: Improvement Act 1786 c 17
 Tobacco Duties Act 1786 c 52
 Tonbridge to Maidstone Road Act 1786 c 154
 Trade Act 1786 c 1
 Trade with America Act 1786 c 4
 Unlawful Pawning Act 1786 c 92
 Wareham and Purbeck Roads Act 1786 c 122
 Welford Bridge to Milston Lane Road Act 1786 c 148
 Westbury, Wiltshire (Additional Overseer) Act 1786 c 23
 Westminster: Streets Act 1786 c 102
 Westminster: Watching Act 1786 c 112
 Wisbeach Roads Act 1786 c 133
 Wiveliscombe Roads Act 1786 c 135
 Worksop to Attercliffe Road Act 1786 c 125
 Yorkshire Roads Act 1786 c 142
 Yorkshire Roads Act 1786 c 144

1787 (27 Geo. 3)

| {{|American Loyalists Act 1787|public|39|23-01-1787|note3=|repealed=y|archived=n|}}

| {{|Annuity to Sir John Skynner Act 1787|public|12|23-01-1787|note3=|repealed=y|archived=n|}}

| {{|Appropriation Act 1787|public|33|23-01-1787|note3=|repealed=y|archived=n|}}

| {{|Balby to Worksop Road Act 1787|public|84|23-01-1787|note3=|repealed=y|archived=n|}}

| {{|Berkshire Oxford Buckinghamshire and Hertford Roads Act 1787|public|81|23-01-1787|note3=|repealed=y|archived=n|}}

| {{|Berwick Roads Act 1787|public|89|23-01-1787|note3=|repealed=y|archived=n|}}

| {{|Brecon Roads Act 1787|public|75|23-01-1787|note3=|repealed=y|archived=n|}}

| {{|Camberwell: Streets Act 1787|public|52|23-01-1787|note3=|repealed=y|archived=n|}}

| {{|Canterbury: Streets Act 1787|public|14|23-01-1787|note3=|repealed=y|archived=n|}}

| {{|Chester Roads Act 1787|public|93|23-01-1787|note3=|repealed=y|archived=n|}}

| {{|Competency of Witnesses Act 1787|public|29|23-01-1787|note3=|repealed=y|archived=n|}}

| {{|Continuance of Laws Act 1787|public|36|23-01-1787|note3=|repealed=y|archived=n|}}

| {{|County Palatine of Chester Act 1787|public|43|23-01-1787|note3=|repealed=y|archived=n|}}

| {{|Customs and Excise Act 1787|public|13|23-01-1787|note3=|repealed=y|archived=n|}}

}}

 Derby and Stafford Roads Act 1787 c 87
 Designing and Printing of Linens, etc. Act 1787 c 38
 Devon Gaol Act 1787 c 59
 Devon Roads Act 1787 c 74
 Duchy of Lancaster Act 1787 c 34
 Dumfries Beer Duties Act 1787 c 57
 Duties on Spirit Licences Act 1787 c 30
 East India Company, Warehouses Act 1787 c 48
 East Stonehouse Chapel Act 1787 c 17
 Ecclesiastical Suits Act 1787 c 44
 Edinburgh College of Surgeons Act 1787 c 65
 Edinburgh: Improvement Act 1787 c 51
 Essex Roads Act 1787 c 69
 Exchequer Bills Act 1787 c 23
 Exchequer Bills Act 1787 c 25
 Exemption from Coal Duty Act 1787 c 21
 Exports Act 1787 c 31
 Fisheries Act 1787 c 10
 Forth and Clyde: Navigation Act 1787 c 20
 Forth and Clyde: Navigation Act 1787 c 55
 Gainsborough Bridge Act 1787 c 15
 Glass Duties Act 1787 c 28
 Gloucester and Oxford Roads Act 1787 c 77
 Gloucester Roads Act 1787 c 68
 Gloucester Roads Act 1787 c 78
 Grantham Town Hall Act 1787 c 61
 Hanley Chapel, Stafford Act 1787 c 62
 Hatfield Chase: Drainage Act 1787 c 53
 Importation and Exportation Act 1787 c 27
 Indemnity Act 1787 c 40
 Inquiry into Fees, Public Offices Act 1787 c 35
 Justiciary Circuit and Courts, Scotland Act 1787 c 18
 Kent and Surrey Roads Act 1787 c 70
 Kent and Sussex Roads Act 1787 c 80
 Land Tax Act 1787 c 5
 Land Tax Act 1787 c 47
 Lincoln and Nottinghamshire Roads Act 1787 c 71
 Lincoln Drainage Act 1787 c 66
 Loans or Exchequer Bills Act 1787 c 24
 Lotteries Act 1787 c 41
 Lottery Act 1787 c 1
 Malt Duties Act 1787 c 4
 Margate: Improvement Act 1787 c 45
 Marine Mutiny Act 1787 c 3
 Milford to Portsmouth Road Act 1787 c 95
 Militia Pay, etc. Act 1787 c 8
 Mutiny Act 1787 c 6
 Negotiations of Certain Notes and Bills Act 1787 c 16
 Newcastle Theatre Act 1787 c 50
 New South Wales Act 1787 c 2
 Nottingham to Mansfield Road Act 1787 c 76
 Papists Act 1787 c 42
 Pawnbrokers Act 1787 c 37
 Portsea Chapel Act 1787 c 64
 Post Horse Duties Act 1787 c 26
 Postage Act 1787 c 9
 River Cart: Navigation Act 1787 c 56
 Roxburgh Roads Act 1787 c 79
 Saint James' Parish, Bristol Act 1787 c 49
 Saint Mary Church, Wanstead Act 1787 c 63
 Sale of Certain Houses, etc., Belonging to His Majesty Act 1787 c 22
 Salop Roads Act 1787 c 85
 Sandwich: Improvement Act 1787 c 67
 Shipping and Navigation Act 1787 c 19
 Smuggling, etc. Act 1787 c 32
 Southampton and Berkshire Roads Act 1787 c 94
 Stafford and Worcester Roads Act 1787 c 82
 Stafford Gaol Act 1787 c 60
 Stafford Roads Act 1787 c 88
 Stafford Roads Act 1787 c 90
 Stafford Roads Act 1787 c 91
 Stamford and Grantham Roads Act 1787 c 92
 Stirling Roads Act 1787 c 83
 Sussex Gaol Act 1787 c 58
 Sussex Roads Act 1787 c 72
 Trade with America Act 1787 c 7
 Vagrants and Criminals Act 1787 c 11
 Warwick Worcester and Stafford Roads Act 1787 c 73
 Westminster: Improvement Act 1787 c 54
 Yorkshire Roads Act 1787 c 86

1788 (28 Geo. 3)

| {{|Anglesea: Drainage, etc. Act 1788|public|71|27-11-1787|note3=|repealed=y|archived=n|}}

| {{|Annuity to Brook Watson, Esquire Act 1788|public|43|27-11-1787|note3=|repealed=y|archived=n|}}

| {{|Annuity to Duke of Saint Albans Act 1788|public|41|27-11-1787|note3=|repealed=y|archived=n|}}

| {{|Annuity to Family of Sir Guy Carlton Act 1788|public|42|27-11-1787|note3=|repealed=y|archived=n|}}

| {{|Appropriation Act 1788|public|26|27-11-1787|note3=|repealed=y|archived=n|}}

| {{|Bolton Grammar School Act 1788|public|81|27-11-1787|note3=|repealed=y|archived=n|}}

| {{|Bristol: Building Act 1788|public|66|27-11-1787|note3=|repealed=y|archived=n|}}

| {{|Bristol Guildhall, etc. Act 1788|public|67|27-11-1787|note3=|repealed=y|archived=n|}}

| {{|Bristol: Improvement Act 1788|public|65|27-11-1787|note3=|repealed=y|archived=n|}}

}}

 Cambridge: Improvement Act 1788 c 64
 Carmarthen Roads Act 1788 c 109
 Catterick Bridge to Durham Road Act 1788 c 90
 Charles Radcliffe's Estates Act 1788 c 63
 Chester and Stafford Roads Act 1788 c 104
 Chester: Improvement Act 1788 c 82
 Chester Roads Act 1788 c 111
 Chimney Sweepers Act 1788 c 48
 Christchurch, Middlesex: Improvement Act 1788 c 60
 Clerkenwell Church Act 1788 c 10
 Coal Trade Act 1788 c 53
 Compensation to American Loyalists, etc. Act 1788 c 40
 Continuance of Laws Act 1788 c 23
 Continuance of Laws Act 1788 c 24
 Controverted Elections Act 1788 c 52
 County Elections Act 1788 c 36
 Customs Act 1788 c 27
 Customs Act 1788 c 33
 Dartford Roads Act 1788 c 84
 Denbigh Roads Act 1788 c 112
 Derby Bridge Act 1788 c 77
 Derby Roads Act 1788 c 89
 Deritend Bridge, Birmingham: Rebuilding Act 1788 c 70
 Discharge of a Crown Debt Act 1788 c 32 
 Donnington to Southall Canal Act 1788 c 73
 Dorset Roads Act 1788 c 91
 Dumfries Roads Act 1788 c 114
 Duty on Spirits Act 1788 c 4
 East India Company Act 1788 c 8
 East India Company (Money) Act 1788 c 29. Sometimes called the East India Company Act 1788.
 Erection of Lighthouses Act 1788 c 25
 Excise Act 1788 c 37
 Excise Act 1788 c 46
 Exeter: Poor Relief Act 1788 c 76
 Exportation Act 1788 c 16
 Exportation Act 1788 c 38
 Exportation Act 1788 c 45
 Flint Canal Act 1788 c 72
 Flint Roads Act 1788 c 101
 Glasgow Roads Act 1788 c 92
 Gold and Silver Thread Act 1788 c 7
 Hertford: Improvement Act 1788 c 75
 Huddersfield Roads Act 1788 c 103
 Importation Act 1788 c 39
 Indemnity Act 1788 c 22
 Inverness Gaol Act 1788 c 69
 Justices of the Peace Act 1788 c 49
 Kent and Sussex Roads Act 1788 c 85
 Kent Roads Act 1788 c 93
 Kingston-upon-Hull Roads Act 1788 c 95
 Lancaster Roads Act 1788 c 113
 Land Tax Act 1788 c 2
 Leicester Roads Act 1788 c 100
 Leith Harbour Act 1788 c 58
 Liverpool: Improvement Act 1788 c 13
 Loans or Exchequer Bills Act 1788 c 18
 Loans or Exchequer Bills Act 1788 c 19
 Losses from Cession of East Florida Act 1788 c 31
 Lottery Act 1788 c 21
 Malt Duties Act 1788 c 1
 Manufacture of Ounce Thread Act 1788 c 17
 Marine Insurance Act 1788 c 56
 Marine Mutiny Act 1788 c 3
 Militia Pay Act 1788 c 11
 Montgomery Salop and Denbigh Roads Act 1788 c 96
 Mutiny Act 1788 c 12
 Newcastle and Gateshead Bridge Act 1788 c 78
 Newfoundland Fisheries Act 1788 c 35
 North Kyme Drainage Act 1788 c 14
 Nottinghamshire and Derby Roads Act 1788 c 87
 Nottinghamshire and Derby Roads Act 1788 c 99
 Paddington Parish Church Act 1788 c 74
 Papists Act 1788 c 47
 Pawnbrokers Act 1788 c 50
 Pembroke Roads Act 1788 c 102
 Protection of Stocking Frames, etc. Act 1788 c 55
 Quarantine and Customs Act 1788 c 34
 Radnor Roads Act 1788 c 105
 Saint Paul Covent Garden Church: Rebuilding Act 1788 c 83
 Saint Peter le Poor Parish Church Act 1788 c 62
 Salop Roads Act 1788 c 94
 Sawley Ferry Bridge: Trent Act 1788 c 80
 Slave Trade Act 1788 c 54
 South Shields Water Act 1788 c 15
 Southern Whale Fishery Act 1788 c 20
 Southwark Improvement Act 1788 c 68
 Stafford Roads Act 1788 c 98
 Stage Coaches Act 1788 c 57
 Stamp Duties Act 1788 c 28
 Suffolk Roads Act 1788 c 97
 Taunton: Improvement Act 1788 c 79
 Thames Navigation Act 1788 c 51
 Theatrical Representations Act 1788 c 30
 Trade Act 1788 c 6
 Trade with America Act 1788 c 5
 Tyne Skippers and Keelmen (Relief Fund) Act 1788 c 59
 Warwick Bridge Act 1788 c 9
 Warwick Roads Act 1788 c 107
 Whitehaven: Improvement Act 1788 c 61
 Wiltshire Roads Act 1788 c 86
 Worcester and Warwick Roads Act 1788 c 88
 Worcester and Warwick Roads. Act 1788 c 115
 Yorkshire Roads Act 1788 c 106
 Yorkshire Roads Act 1788 c 108
 Yorkshire Roads Act 1788 c 110

1789 (29 Geo. 3)

| {{|Andover Canal Act 1789|public|72|20-11-1788|note3=|repealed=y|archived=n|}}

| {{|Appropriation Act 1789|public|61|20-11-1788|note3=|repealed=y|archived=n|}}

| {{|Ayr Roads Act 1789|public|79|20-11-1788|note3=|repealed=y|archived=n|}}

| {{|Barthomley Church, Chester Act 1789|public|11|20-11-1788|note3=|repealed=y|archived=n|}}

| {{|Bath: Improvement Act 1789|public|73|20-11-1788|note3=|repealed=y|archived=n|}}

| {{|Bedford Level Act 1789|public|22|20-11-1788|note3=|repealed=y|archived=n|}}

| {{|Bridlington Pier Act 1789|public|23|20-11-1788|note3=|repealed=y|archived=n|}}

| {{|Chelmsford: Improvement Act 1789|public|44|20-11-1788|note3=|repealed=y|archived=n|}}

| {{|Chester and Derby Roads Act 1789|public|93|20-11-1788|note3=|repealed=y|archived=n|}}

| {{|Chester Roads Act 1789|public|99|20-11-1788|note3=|repealed=y|archived=n|}}

| {{|City of London: Improvement Act 1789|public|38|20-11-1788|note3=|repealed=y|archived=n|}}

| {{|Cockburnspath Bridge, Berwick Act 1789|public|42|20-11-1788|note3=|repealed=y|archived=n|}}

| {{|Continuance of Laws Act 1789|public|55|20-11-1788|note3=|repealed=y|archived=n|}}

| {{|County Elections Act 1789|public|13|20-11-1788|note3=|repealed=y|archived=n|}}

| {{|County Elections Act 1789|public|18|20-11-1788|note3=|repealed=y|archived=n|}}

| {{|Cromford Canal Act 1789|public|74|20-11-1788|note3=|repealed=y|archived=n|}}

| {{|Cumberland Roads Act 1789|public|97|20-11-1788|note3=|repealed=y|archived=n|}}

| {{|Customs Act 1789|public|59|20-11-1788|note3=|repealed=y|archived=n|}}

| {{|Customs Act 1789|public|60|20-11-1788|note3=|repealed=y|archived=n|}}

| {{|Customs Act 1789|public|64|20-11-1788|note3=|repealed=y|archived=n|}}

}}

 Designing and Printing of Linens, etc. Act 1789 c 19
 Destruction of Property (Scotland) Act 1789 c 46
 Doncaster to Chester Road Act 1789 c 98
 Dumfries Roads Act 1789 c 87
 Durham Roads Act 1789 c 81
 Duties on Horses and Carriage Act 1789 c 49
 Duties on Shops Act 1789 c 9
 Duties on Tobacco and Snuff Act 1789 c 68
 Duty on Hawkers, etc. Act 1789 c 26
 East India Company (Money) Act 1789 c 65. Sometimes called the East India Company Stock Act 1789.
 Edinburgh Roads Act 1789 c 105
 Erection of Lighthouses Act 1789 c 52
 Essex Shire House Act 1789 c 8
 Evesham Roads Act 1789 c 103
 Excise Act 1789 c 63
 Excise Duties Act 1789 c 45
 Faversham (Improvement) Act 1789 c 69
 Flax and Cotton Manufactures Act 1789 c 54
 Forehoe, Norfolk (Guardians' Borrowing Powers) Act 1789 c 4
 Forfar Roads Act 1789 c 20
 Forfeited Estates (Scotland) Act 1789 c 28
 Gaols Act 1789 c 67
 Greenock: Improvement Act 1789 c 43
 Hastings: Improvement Act 1789 c 27
 Hereford Roads Act 1789 c 108
 Hereford and Gloucester Roads Act 1789 c 104
 Highworth, Wiltshire (Workhouse and Additional Overseer) Act 1789 c 29
 Importation Act 1789 c 16
 Importation and Exportation Act 1789 c 58
 Indemnity Act 1789 c 40
 Kent and Sussex Roads Act 1789 c 85
 Kent Roads Act 1789 c 84
 Kent Roads Act 1789 c 100
 Knaresborough Inclosure Act 1789 c 76
 Lanark and Renfrew Roads Act 1789 c 92
 Lancaster Roads Act 1789 c 107
 Lancaster Roads Act 1789 c 110
 Land Tax Act 1789 c 6
 Lincoln: Drainage Act 1789 c 32
 Lincoln: Drainage Act 1789 c 70
 Llanfyllin Market House Act 1789 c 24
 Loans or Exchequer Bills Act 1789 c 34
 Loans or Exchequer Bills Act 1789 c 35
 Lottery Act 1789 c 33
 Malt Duties Act 1789 c 10
 Manchester Square: Improvement Act 1789 c 5
 Marine Mutiny Act 1789 c 3
 Middlesex Roads Act 1789 c 96
 Militia Pay Act 1789 c 15
 Mutiny Act 1789 c 2
 Nantwich to Chester Road Act 1789 c 91
 National Debt Act 1789 c 37
 New Shoreham Harbour Act 1789 c 21
 Northumberland Fishery Act 1789 c 25
 Odiham to Farnham Roads Act 1789 c 89
 Old Street Road Middlesex Act 1789 c 82
 Oxford Roads Act 1789 c 90
 Papists Act 1789 c 36
 Pawnbrokers Act 1789 c 57
 Perth Roads Act 1789 c 17
 River Lune: Navigation Act 1789 c 39
 Roxburgh Roads Act 1789 c 7
 Saint Chad, Shrewsbury Parish Church Act 1789 c 31
 Saint George, Hanover Square: Improvement Act 1789 c 75
 Saint Giles, Pontefract Act 1789 c 48
 Saint James, Westminster: Improvement Act 1789 c 47
 Saint Mary, Wanstead Act 1789 c 14
 Saint Pancras: Improvement Act 1789 c 71
 Saint Paul, Covent Garden: Church Repair, etc. Act 1789 c 30
 Slave Trade Act 1789 c 66
 Somerset Roads Act 1789 c 101
 Southampton Roads Act 1789 c 88
 Southwold Harbour Act 1789 c 77
 Stafford and Warwick Roads Act 1789 c 83
 Stamps Act 1789 c 50
 Stamps Act 1789 c 51
 Stourbridge Worcester Roads Act 1789 c 95
 Suffolk Roads Act 1789 c 94
 Sunderland to Durham Roads Act 1789 c 80
 Tontine Annuities Act 1789 c 41
 Trade Act 1789 c 56
 Trade with America Act 1789 c 1
 Wakefield to Abberford Road Act 1789 c 86
 Whale Fisheries Act 1789 c 53
 Whitby: Improvement Act 1789 c 12
 Worcester and Warwick Roads. Act 1789 c 106
 Worcester Roads Act 1789 c 102
 Yorkshire: Drainage Act 1789 c 78
 Yorkshire Roads Act 1789 c 109

See also
List of Acts of the Parliament of Great Britain

References

External links
The Statutes of the Realm
- Volume 33 - 20 George III - 1779-80 - and 21 George III - 1780-1
- Volume 34 - 22 George III - 1781-2 - and 23 George III - 1782-3 - and 24 George III - 1783-4
- Volume 35 - 25 George III - 1785 -  and 26 George III - 1786
- Volume 36 - 27 George III - 1787 - and 28 George III - 1787-8 - and 29 George III - 1789

1780
1780s in Great Britain